

223001–223100 

|-bgcolor=#fefefe
| 223001 ||  || — || September 13, 2002 || Palomar || NEAT || V || align=right data-sort-value="0.92" | 920 m || 
|-id=002 bgcolor=#fefefe
| 223002 ||  || — || September 14, 2002 || Kitt Peak || Spacewatch || — || align=right | 1.6 km || 
|-id=003 bgcolor=#d6d6d6
| 223003 ||  || — || September 12, 2002 || Palomar || NEAT || 7:4 || align=right | 7.0 km || 
|-id=004 bgcolor=#fefefe
| 223004 ||  || — || September 13, 2002 || Palomar || NEAT || NYS || align=right data-sort-value="0.60" | 600 m || 
|-id=005 bgcolor=#fefefe
| 223005 ||  || — || September 13, 2002 || Palomar || NEAT || — || align=right | 1.2 km || 
|-id=006 bgcolor=#fefefe
| 223006 ||  || — || September 12, 2002 || Palomar || NEAT || — || align=right | 1.1 km || 
|-id=007 bgcolor=#fefefe
| 223007 ||  || — || September 13, 2002 || Palomar || NEAT || FLO || align=right | 1.5 km || 
|-id=008 bgcolor=#fefefe
| 223008 ||  || — || September 15, 2002 || Kitt Peak || Spacewatch || — || align=right | 1.0 km || 
|-id=009 bgcolor=#fefefe
| 223009 ||  || — || September 14, 2002 || Haleakala || NEAT || — || align=right | 1.2 km || 
|-id=010 bgcolor=#fefefe
| 223010 ||  || — || September 13, 2002 || Anderson Mesa || LONEOS || — || align=right | 1.9 km || 
|-id=011 bgcolor=#fefefe
| 223011 ||  || — || September 14, 2002 || Palomar || R. Matson || — || align=right | 1.4 km || 
|-id=012 bgcolor=#d6d6d6
| 223012 ||  || — || September 14, 2002 || Palomar || R. Matson || — || align=right | 6.9 km || 
|-id=013 bgcolor=#fefefe
| 223013 ||  || — || September 14, 2002 || Palomar || R. Matson || — || align=right | 1.2 km || 
|-id=014 bgcolor=#fefefe
| 223014 ||  || — || September 27, 2002 || Palomar || NEAT || PHO || align=right | 2.8 km || 
|-id=015 bgcolor=#fefefe
| 223015 ||  || — || September 26, 2002 || Palomar || NEAT || NYS || align=right data-sort-value="0.74" | 740 m || 
|-id=016 bgcolor=#fefefe
| 223016 ||  || — || September 27, 2002 || Palomar || NEAT || FLO || align=right | 1.2 km || 
|-id=017 bgcolor=#fefefe
| 223017 ||  || — || September 27, 2002 || Palomar || NEAT || — || align=right | 1.2 km || 
|-id=018 bgcolor=#fefefe
| 223018 ||  || — || September 27, 2002 || Palomar || NEAT || — || align=right data-sort-value="0.83" | 830 m || 
|-id=019 bgcolor=#fefefe
| 223019 ||  || — || September 26, 2002 || Palomar || NEAT || — || align=right | 1.2 km || 
|-id=020 bgcolor=#fefefe
| 223020 ||  || — || September 27, 2002 || Anderson Mesa || LONEOS || FLO || align=right data-sort-value="0.83" | 830 m || 
|-id=021 bgcolor=#fefefe
| 223021 ||  || — || September 28, 2002 || Palomar || NEAT || — || align=right | 1.3 km || 
|-id=022 bgcolor=#fefefe
| 223022 ||  || — || September 28, 2002 || Haleakala || NEAT || FLO || align=right | 1.0 km || 
|-id=023 bgcolor=#fefefe
| 223023 ||  || — || September 29, 2002 || Haleakala || NEAT || — || align=right data-sort-value="0.95" | 950 m || 
|-id=024 bgcolor=#fefefe
| 223024 ||  || — || September 28, 2002 || Haleakala || NEAT || PHO || align=right | 1.6 km || 
|-id=025 bgcolor=#fefefe
| 223025 ||  || — || September 28, 2002 || Haleakala || NEAT || V || align=right | 1.1 km || 
|-id=026 bgcolor=#fefefe
| 223026 ||  || — || September 29, 2002 || Haleakala || NEAT || — || align=right data-sort-value="0.84" | 840 m || 
|-id=027 bgcolor=#fefefe
| 223027 ||  || — || September 17, 2002 || Palomar || NEAT || V || align=right | 1.0 km || 
|-id=028 bgcolor=#fefefe
| 223028 ||  || — || September 17, 2002 || Palomar || NEAT || — || align=right | 1.2 km || 
|-id=029 bgcolor=#fefefe
| 223029 ||  || — || September 28, 2002 || Haleakala || NEAT || — || align=right | 1.5 km || 
|-id=030 bgcolor=#fefefe
| 223030 ||  || — || October 1, 2002 || Anderson Mesa || LONEOS || — || align=right | 1.3 km || 
|-id=031 bgcolor=#fefefe
| 223031 ||  || — || October 1, 2002 || Anderson Mesa || LONEOS || — || align=right data-sort-value="0.87" | 870 m || 
|-id=032 bgcolor=#fefefe
| 223032 ||  || — || October 2, 2002 || Socorro || LINEAR || — || align=right | 1.4 km || 
|-id=033 bgcolor=#fefefe
| 223033 ||  || — || October 2, 2002 || Socorro || LINEAR || NYS || align=right data-sort-value="0.74" | 740 m || 
|-id=034 bgcolor=#fefefe
| 223034 ||  || — || October 2, 2002 || Socorro || LINEAR || — || align=right | 1.3 km || 
|-id=035 bgcolor=#fefefe
| 223035 ||  || — || October 2, 2002 || Socorro || LINEAR || V || align=right | 1.1 km || 
|-id=036 bgcolor=#fefefe
| 223036 ||  || — || October 2, 2002 || Socorro || LINEAR || V || align=right | 1.0 km || 
|-id=037 bgcolor=#fefefe
| 223037 ||  || — || October 2, 2002 || Socorro || LINEAR || FLO || align=right | 1.1 km || 
|-id=038 bgcolor=#fefefe
| 223038 ||  || — || October 2, 2002 || Socorro || LINEAR || — || align=right | 1.2 km || 
|-id=039 bgcolor=#fefefe
| 223039 ||  || — || October 2, 2002 || Socorro || LINEAR || — || align=right | 1.4 km || 
|-id=040 bgcolor=#fefefe
| 223040 ||  || — || October 2, 2002 || Socorro || LINEAR || — || align=right | 1.3 km || 
|-id=041 bgcolor=#fefefe
| 223041 ||  || — || October 2, 2002 || Socorro || LINEAR || — || align=right | 1.7 km || 
|-id=042 bgcolor=#FA8072
| 223042 ||  || — || October 2, 2002 || Campo Imperatore || CINEOS || — || align=right | 1.5 km || 
|-id=043 bgcolor=#fefefe
| 223043 ||  || — || October 3, 2002 || Palomar || NEAT || V || align=right | 1.2 km || 
|-id=044 bgcolor=#fefefe
| 223044 ||  || — || October 3, 2002 || Palomar || NEAT || — || align=right | 1.5 km || 
|-id=045 bgcolor=#fefefe
| 223045 ||  || — || October 1, 2002 || Anderson Mesa || LONEOS || — || align=right | 2.0 km || 
|-id=046 bgcolor=#fefefe
| 223046 ||  || — || October 1, 2002 || Anderson Mesa || LONEOS || V || align=right | 1.3 km || 
|-id=047 bgcolor=#fefefe
| 223047 ||  || — || October 1, 2002 || Anderson Mesa || LONEOS || — || align=right | 1.1 km || 
|-id=048 bgcolor=#fefefe
| 223048 ||  || — || October 1, 2002 || Haleakala || NEAT || — || align=right | 1.1 km || 
|-id=049 bgcolor=#fefefe
| 223049 ||  || — || October 2, 2002 || Haleakala || NEAT || FLO || align=right data-sort-value="0.94" | 940 m || 
|-id=050 bgcolor=#FA8072
| 223050 ||  || — || October 3, 2002 || Palomar || NEAT || — || align=right | 1.1 km || 
|-id=051 bgcolor=#fefefe
| 223051 ||  || — || October 3, 2002 || Palomar || NEAT || — || align=right | 1.3 km || 
|-id=052 bgcolor=#d6d6d6
| 223052 ||  || — || October 4, 2002 || Palomar || NEAT || HYG || align=right | 4.2 km || 
|-id=053 bgcolor=#fefefe
| 223053 ||  || — || October 4, 2002 || Socorro || LINEAR || V || align=right | 1.0 km || 
|-id=054 bgcolor=#d6d6d6
| 223054 ||  || — || October 4, 2002 || Palomar || NEAT || SYL7:4 || align=right | 6.8 km || 
|-id=055 bgcolor=#fefefe
| 223055 ||  || — || October 5, 2002 || Palomar || NEAT || FLO || align=right data-sort-value="0.96" | 960 m || 
|-id=056 bgcolor=#fefefe
| 223056 ||  || — || October 4, 2002 || Palomar || NEAT || FLO || align=right | 1.1 km || 
|-id=057 bgcolor=#fefefe
| 223057 ||  || — || October 4, 2002 || Socorro || LINEAR || — || align=right | 1.5 km || 
|-id=058 bgcolor=#fefefe
| 223058 ||  || — || October 5, 2002 || Socorro || LINEAR || V || align=right | 1.1 km || 
|-id=059 bgcolor=#fefefe
| 223059 ||  || — || October 5, 2002 || Socorro || LINEAR || — || align=right | 1.4 km || 
|-id=060 bgcolor=#fefefe
| 223060 ||  || — || October 4, 2002 || Socorro || LINEAR || FLO || align=right | 1.1 km || 
|-id=061 bgcolor=#fefefe
| 223061 ||  || — || October 4, 2002 || Socorro || LINEAR || — || align=right | 1.2 km || 
|-id=062 bgcolor=#fefefe
| 223062 ||  || — || October 4, 2002 || Socorro || LINEAR || NYS || align=right | 2.5 km || 
|-id=063 bgcolor=#fefefe
| 223063 ||  || — || October 4, 2002 || Socorro || LINEAR || — || align=right | 1.3 km || 
|-id=064 bgcolor=#fefefe
| 223064 ||  || — || October 8, 2002 || Anderson Mesa || LONEOS || — || align=right | 1.0 km || 
|-id=065 bgcolor=#fefefe
| 223065 ||  || — || October 7, 2002 || Haleakala || NEAT || — || align=right | 1.4 km || 
|-id=066 bgcolor=#fefefe
| 223066 ||  || — || October 8, 2002 || Palomar || NEAT || PHO || align=right | 1.5 km || 
|-id=067 bgcolor=#fefefe
| 223067 ||  || — || October 8, 2002 || Anderson Mesa || LONEOS || V || align=right | 1.2 km || 
|-id=068 bgcolor=#fefefe
| 223068 ||  || — || October 9, 2002 || Socorro || LINEAR || — || align=right | 1.1 km || 
|-id=069 bgcolor=#fefefe
| 223069 ||  || — || October 9, 2002 || Socorro || LINEAR || NYS || align=right data-sort-value="0.86" | 860 m || 
|-id=070 bgcolor=#fefefe
| 223070 ||  || — || October 9, 2002 || Palomar || NEAT || — || align=right data-sort-value="0.93" | 930 m || 
|-id=071 bgcolor=#fefefe
| 223071 ||  || — || October 9, 2002 || Socorro || LINEAR || — || align=right data-sort-value="0.94" | 940 m || 
|-id=072 bgcolor=#fefefe
| 223072 ||  || — || October 7, 2002 || Anderson Mesa || LONEOS || NYS || align=right | 3.0 km || 
|-id=073 bgcolor=#fefefe
| 223073 ||  || — || October 9, 2002 || Socorro || LINEAR || — || align=right | 1.4 km || 
|-id=074 bgcolor=#FA8072
| 223074 ||  || — || October 9, 2002 || Socorro || LINEAR || — || align=right data-sort-value="0.85" | 850 m || 
|-id=075 bgcolor=#fefefe
| 223075 ||  || — || October 9, 2002 || Socorro || LINEAR || — || align=right | 1.2 km || 
|-id=076 bgcolor=#fefefe
| 223076 ||  || — || October 9, 2002 || Socorro || LINEAR || — || align=right | 1.5 km || 
|-id=077 bgcolor=#fefefe
| 223077 ||  || — || October 9, 2002 || Socorro || LINEAR || — || align=right | 1.3 km || 
|-id=078 bgcolor=#fefefe
| 223078 ||  || — || October 10, 2002 || Palomar || NEAT || V || align=right data-sort-value="0.89" | 890 m || 
|-id=079 bgcolor=#fefefe
| 223079 ||  || — || October 9, 2002 || Socorro || LINEAR || FLO || align=right data-sort-value="0.98" | 980 m || 
|-id=080 bgcolor=#fefefe
| 223080 ||  || — || October 9, 2002 || Socorro || LINEAR || — || align=right | 1.2 km || 
|-id=081 bgcolor=#fefefe
| 223081 ||  || — || October 10, 2002 || Socorro || LINEAR || — || align=right | 1.7 km || 
|-id=082 bgcolor=#fefefe
| 223082 ||  || — || October 10, 2002 || Socorro || LINEAR || V || align=right | 1.0 km || 
|-id=083 bgcolor=#fefefe
| 223083 ||  || — || October 10, 2002 || Socorro || LINEAR || FLO || align=right | 1.1 km || 
|-id=084 bgcolor=#fefefe
| 223084 ||  || — || October 10, 2002 || Socorro || LINEAR || — || align=right | 1.2 km || 
|-id=085 bgcolor=#fefefe
| 223085 ||  || — || October 10, 2002 || Socorro || LINEAR || — || align=right | 1.5 km || 
|-id=086 bgcolor=#fefefe
| 223086 ||  || — || October 10, 2002 || Socorro || LINEAR || FLO || align=right | 1.1 km || 
|-id=087 bgcolor=#fefefe
| 223087 ||  || — || October 10, 2002 || Socorro || LINEAR || V || align=right | 1.1 km || 
|-id=088 bgcolor=#fefefe
| 223088 ||  || — || October 10, 2002 || Socorro || LINEAR || — || align=right | 1.6 km || 
|-id=089 bgcolor=#fefefe
| 223089 ||  || — || October 10, 2002 || Apache Point || SDSS || — || align=right data-sort-value="0.62" | 620 m || 
|-id=090 bgcolor=#fefefe
| 223090 ||  || — || October 15, 2002 || Palomar || NEAT || V || align=right | 1.0 km || 
|-id=091 bgcolor=#fefefe
| 223091 ||  || — || October 11, 2002 || Palomar || NEAT || — || align=right | 1.2 km || 
|-id=092 bgcolor=#fefefe
| 223092 ||  || — || October 28, 2002 || Palomar || NEAT || — || align=right | 1.0 km || 
|-id=093 bgcolor=#fefefe
| 223093 ||  || — || October 29, 2002 || Nogales || Tenagra II Obs. || FLO || align=right data-sort-value="0.87" | 870 m || 
|-id=094 bgcolor=#fefefe
| 223094 ||  || — || October 28, 2002 || Haleakala || NEAT || — || align=right data-sort-value="0.87" | 870 m || 
|-id=095 bgcolor=#fefefe
| 223095 ||  || — || October 30, 2002 || Haleakala || NEAT || NYS || align=right | 1.1 km || 
|-id=096 bgcolor=#fefefe
| 223096 ||  || — || October 30, 2002 || Palomar || NEAT || V || align=right | 1.3 km || 
|-id=097 bgcolor=#fefefe
| 223097 ||  || — || October 30, 2002 || Haleakala || NEAT || — || align=right | 1.3 km || 
|-id=098 bgcolor=#fefefe
| 223098 ||  || — || October 31, 2002 || Anderson Mesa || LONEOS || V || align=right data-sort-value="0.87" | 870 m || 
|-id=099 bgcolor=#fefefe
| 223099 ||  || — || October 31, 2002 || Palomar || NEAT || NYS || align=right data-sort-value="0.93" | 930 m || 
|-id=100 bgcolor=#fefefe
| 223100 ||  || — || October 31, 2002 || Palomar || NEAT || — || align=right | 1.2 km || 
|}

223101–223200 

|-bgcolor=#fefefe
| 223101 ||  || — || October 31, 2002 || Anderson Mesa || LONEOS || — || align=right | 1.1 km || 
|-id=102 bgcolor=#fefefe
| 223102 ||  || — || October 31, 2002 || Anderson Mesa || LONEOS || — || align=right data-sort-value="0.98" | 980 m || 
|-id=103 bgcolor=#d6d6d6
| 223103 ||  || — || October 29, 2002 || Apache Point || SDSS || — || align=right | 3.2 km || 
|-id=104 bgcolor=#fefefe
| 223104 ||  || — || October 30, 2002 || Apache Point || SDSS || — || align=right data-sort-value="0.83" | 830 m || 
|-id=105 bgcolor=#fefefe
| 223105 ||  || — || November 1, 2002 || Palomar || NEAT || PHO || align=right | 1.3 km || 
|-id=106 bgcolor=#fefefe
| 223106 ||  || — || November 1, 2002 || Palomar || NEAT || NYS || align=right | 1.0 km || 
|-id=107 bgcolor=#fefefe
| 223107 ||  || — || November 4, 2002 || Palomar || NEAT || NYS || align=right | 1.1 km || 
|-id=108 bgcolor=#fefefe
| 223108 ||  || — || November 4, 2002 || Kitt Peak || Spacewatch || NYS || align=right | 2.3 km || 
|-id=109 bgcolor=#fefefe
| 223109 ||  || — || November 5, 2002 || Socorro || LINEAR || — || align=right | 1.1 km || 
|-id=110 bgcolor=#fefefe
| 223110 ||  || — || November 5, 2002 || Socorro || LINEAR || V || align=right | 1.0 km || 
|-id=111 bgcolor=#fefefe
| 223111 ||  || — || November 5, 2002 || Kitt Peak || Spacewatch || MAS || align=right | 1.0 km || 
|-id=112 bgcolor=#fefefe
| 223112 ||  || — || November 5, 2002 || Kitt Peak || Spacewatch || FLO || align=right data-sort-value="0.77" | 770 m || 
|-id=113 bgcolor=#fefefe
| 223113 ||  || — || November 5, 2002 || Socorro || LINEAR || V || align=right | 1.0 km || 
|-id=114 bgcolor=#fefefe
| 223114 ||  || — || November 5, 2002 || Socorro || LINEAR || — || align=right | 1.3 km || 
|-id=115 bgcolor=#fefefe
| 223115 ||  || — || November 5, 2002 || Socorro || LINEAR || — || align=right | 1.9 km || 
|-id=116 bgcolor=#fefefe
| 223116 ||  || — || November 5, 2002 || Socorro || LINEAR || FLO || align=right data-sort-value="0.85" | 850 m || 
|-id=117 bgcolor=#fefefe
| 223117 ||  || — || November 5, 2002 || Socorro || LINEAR || — || align=right data-sort-value="0.99" | 990 m || 
|-id=118 bgcolor=#fefefe
| 223118 ||  || — || November 5, 2002 || Socorro || LINEAR || NYS || align=right | 1.1 km || 
|-id=119 bgcolor=#fefefe
| 223119 ||  || — || November 5, 2002 || Socorro || LINEAR || — || align=right | 1.5 km || 
|-id=120 bgcolor=#fefefe
| 223120 ||  || — || November 5, 2002 || Socorro || LINEAR || NYS || align=right data-sort-value="0.86" | 860 m || 
|-id=121 bgcolor=#fefefe
| 223121 ||  || — || November 5, 2002 || Socorro || LINEAR || V || align=right | 1.1 km || 
|-id=122 bgcolor=#fefefe
| 223122 ||  || — || November 5, 2002 || Socorro || LINEAR || NYS || align=right | 1.1 km || 
|-id=123 bgcolor=#fefefe
| 223123 ||  || — || November 5, 2002 || Socorro || LINEAR || — || align=right | 1.1 km || 
|-id=124 bgcolor=#fefefe
| 223124 ||  || — || November 5, 2002 || Palomar || NEAT || — || align=right data-sort-value="0.93" | 930 m || 
|-id=125 bgcolor=#fefefe
| 223125 ||  || — || November 5, 2002 || Anderson Mesa || LONEOS || — || align=right | 1.2 km || 
|-id=126 bgcolor=#fefefe
| 223126 ||  || — || November 6, 2002 || Haleakala || NEAT || — || align=right | 1.2 km || 
|-id=127 bgcolor=#fefefe
| 223127 ||  || — || November 5, 2002 || Socorro || LINEAR || — || align=right | 1.1 km || 
|-id=128 bgcolor=#fefefe
| 223128 ||  || — || November 6, 2002 || Anderson Mesa || LONEOS || FLO || align=right | 1.7 km || 
|-id=129 bgcolor=#fefefe
| 223129 ||  || — || November 6, 2002 || Haleakala || NEAT || — || align=right | 1.2 km || 
|-id=130 bgcolor=#fefefe
| 223130 ||  || — || November 7, 2002 || Socorro || LINEAR || — || align=right data-sort-value="0.99" | 990 m || 
|-id=131 bgcolor=#fefefe
| 223131 ||  || — || November 7, 2002 || Socorro || LINEAR || — || align=right | 1.5 km || 
|-id=132 bgcolor=#fefefe
| 223132 ||  || — || November 7, 2002 || Socorro || LINEAR || — || align=right | 1.5 km || 
|-id=133 bgcolor=#fefefe
| 223133 ||  || — || November 7, 2002 || Socorro || LINEAR || — || align=right | 1.4 km || 
|-id=134 bgcolor=#fefefe
| 223134 ||  || — || November 8, 2002 || Socorro || LINEAR || NYS || align=right | 2.2 km || 
|-id=135 bgcolor=#fefefe
| 223135 ||  || — || November 8, 2002 || Socorro || LINEAR || V || align=right data-sort-value="0.95" | 950 m || 
|-id=136 bgcolor=#fefefe
| 223136 ||  || — || November 12, 2002 || Socorro || LINEAR || ERI || align=right | 2.1 km || 
|-id=137 bgcolor=#fefefe
| 223137 ||  || — || November 12, 2002 || Socorro || LINEAR || V || align=right data-sort-value="0.90" | 900 m || 
|-id=138 bgcolor=#fefefe
| 223138 ||  || — || November 13, 2002 || Palomar || NEAT || EUT || align=right data-sort-value="0.87" | 870 m || 
|-id=139 bgcolor=#fefefe
| 223139 ||  || — || November 12, 2002 || Socorro || LINEAR || — || align=right | 2.2 km || 
|-id=140 bgcolor=#fefefe
| 223140 ||  || — || November 6, 2002 || Socorro || LINEAR || V || align=right data-sort-value="0.98" | 980 m || 
|-id=141 bgcolor=#fefefe
| 223141 ||  || — || November 1, 2002 || Palomar || S. F. Hönig || FLO || align=right | 1.1 km || 
|-id=142 bgcolor=#fefefe
| 223142 ||  || — || November 23, 2002 || Palomar || NEAT || — || align=right | 1.2 km || 
|-id=143 bgcolor=#fefefe
| 223143 ||  || — || November 24, 2002 || Palomar || NEAT || FLO || align=right data-sort-value="0.79" | 790 m || 
|-id=144 bgcolor=#fefefe
| 223144 ||  || — || November 24, 2002 || Palomar || NEAT || — || align=right | 1.4 km || 
|-id=145 bgcolor=#FA8072
| 223145 ||  || — || November 27, 2002 || Anderson Mesa || LONEOS || — || align=right | 2.0 km || 
|-id=146 bgcolor=#fefefe
| 223146 ||  || — || November 24, 2002 || Palomar || NEAT || — || align=right data-sort-value="0.92" | 920 m || 
|-id=147 bgcolor=#fefefe
| 223147 ||  || — || November 28, 2002 || Anderson Mesa || LONEOS || — || align=right | 1.3 km || 
|-id=148 bgcolor=#fefefe
| 223148 ||  || — || November 24, 2002 || Palomar || NEAT || — || align=right data-sort-value="0.97" | 970 m || 
|-id=149 bgcolor=#fefefe
| 223149 ||  || — || November 16, 2002 || Palomar || NEAT || NYS || align=right data-sort-value="0.56" | 560 m || 
|-id=150 bgcolor=#fefefe
| 223150 ||  || — || December 1, 2002 || Nashville || R. Clingan || — || align=right | 1.0 km || 
|-id=151 bgcolor=#fefefe
| 223151 ||  || — || December 2, 2002 || Socorro || LINEAR || — || align=right | 1.4 km || 
|-id=152 bgcolor=#fefefe
| 223152 ||  || — || December 3, 2002 || Palomar || NEAT || — || align=right | 1.1 km || 
|-id=153 bgcolor=#fefefe
| 223153 ||  || — || December 5, 2002 || Socorro || LINEAR || V || align=right | 1.1 km || 
|-id=154 bgcolor=#fefefe
| 223154 ||  || — || December 5, 2002 || Socorro || LINEAR || V || align=right | 1.1 km || 
|-id=155 bgcolor=#fefefe
| 223155 ||  || — || December 6, 2002 || Socorro || LINEAR || NYS || align=right data-sort-value="0.81" | 810 m || 
|-id=156 bgcolor=#fefefe
| 223156 ||  || — || December 7, 2002 || Fountain Hills || C. W. Juels, P. R. Holvorcem || — || align=right | 2.2 km || 
|-id=157 bgcolor=#fefefe
| 223157 ||  || — || December 6, 2002 || Socorro || LINEAR || — || align=right | 1.4 km || 
|-id=158 bgcolor=#fefefe
| 223158 ||  || — || December 10, 2002 || Socorro || LINEAR || V || align=right data-sort-value="0.87" | 870 m || 
|-id=159 bgcolor=#fefefe
| 223159 ||  || — || December 10, 2002 || Socorro || LINEAR || — || align=right | 1.3 km || 
|-id=160 bgcolor=#fefefe
| 223160 ||  || — || December 10, 2002 || Socorro || LINEAR || — || align=right | 2.2 km || 
|-id=161 bgcolor=#fefefe
| 223161 ||  || — || December 10, 2002 || Socorro || LINEAR || — || align=right | 2.0 km || 
|-id=162 bgcolor=#fefefe
| 223162 ||  || — || December 11, 2002 || Socorro || LINEAR || — || align=right data-sort-value="0.91" | 910 m || 
|-id=163 bgcolor=#fefefe
| 223163 ||  || — || December 11, 2002 || Socorro || LINEAR || — || align=right | 1.3 km || 
|-id=164 bgcolor=#fefefe
| 223164 ||  || — || December 11, 2002 || Socorro || LINEAR || — || align=right | 1.3 km || 
|-id=165 bgcolor=#fefefe
| 223165 ||  || — || December 11, 2002 || Socorro || LINEAR || — || align=right | 3.0 km || 
|-id=166 bgcolor=#fefefe
| 223166 ||  || — || December 5, 2002 || Socorro || LINEAR || — || align=right | 1.7 km || 
|-id=167 bgcolor=#fefefe
| 223167 ||  || — || December 5, 2002 || Socorro || LINEAR || NYS || align=right data-sort-value="0.88" | 880 m || 
|-id=168 bgcolor=#fefefe
| 223168 ||  || — || December 6, 2002 || Socorro || LINEAR || — || align=right | 2.0 km || 
|-id=169 bgcolor=#fefefe
| 223169 ||  || — || December 14, 2002 || Socorro || LINEAR || — || align=right | 1.6 km || 
|-id=170 bgcolor=#fefefe
| 223170 ||  || — || December 31, 2002 || Socorro || LINEAR || — || align=right | 1.1 km || 
|-id=171 bgcolor=#fefefe
| 223171 ||  || — || December 31, 2002 || Socorro || LINEAR || KLI || align=right | 3.0 km || 
|-id=172 bgcolor=#fefefe
| 223172 ||  || — || December 31, 2002 || Socorro || LINEAR || — || align=right | 2.6 km || 
|-id=173 bgcolor=#fefefe
| 223173 ||  || — || December 31, 2002 || Socorro || LINEAR || V || align=right | 1.1 km || 
|-id=174 bgcolor=#fefefe
| 223174 ||  || — || December 31, 2002 || Socorro || LINEAR || — || align=right | 1.2 km || 
|-id=175 bgcolor=#fefefe
| 223175 ||  || — || December 31, 2002 || Socorro || LINEAR || MAS || align=right | 1.1 km || 
|-id=176 bgcolor=#fefefe
| 223176 ||  || — || December 31, 2002 || Socorro || LINEAR || — || align=right | 1.3 km || 
|-id=177 bgcolor=#fefefe
| 223177 ||  || — || December 31, 2002 || Socorro || LINEAR || NYS || align=right data-sort-value="0.88" | 880 m || 
|-id=178 bgcolor=#FA8072
| 223178 ||  || — || January 3, 2003 || Socorro || LINEAR || PHO || align=right | 1.9 km || 
|-id=179 bgcolor=#E9E9E9
| 223179 ||  || — || January 1, 2003 || Socorro || LINEAR || — || align=right | 1.5 km || 
|-id=180 bgcolor=#fefefe
| 223180 ||  || — || January 4, 2003 || Nashville || R. Clingan || NYS || align=right data-sort-value="0.89" | 890 m || 
|-id=181 bgcolor=#fefefe
| 223181 ||  || — || January 5, 2003 || Socorro || LINEAR || V || align=right | 1.0 km || 
|-id=182 bgcolor=#fefefe
| 223182 ||  || — || January 4, 2003 || Socorro || LINEAR || NYS || align=right | 1.2 km || 
|-id=183 bgcolor=#fefefe
| 223183 ||  || — || January 7, 2003 || Socorro || LINEAR || — || align=right | 1.5 km || 
|-id=184 bgcolor=#fefefe
| 223184 ||  || — || January 5, 2003 || Socorro || LINEAR || — || align=right data-sort-value="0.99" | 990 m || 
|-id=185 bgcolor=#fefefe
| 223185 ||  || — || January 5, 2003 || Socorro || LINEAR || NYS || align=right data-sort-value="0.93" | 930 m || 
|-id=186 bgcolor=#fefefe
| 223186 ||  || — || January 5, 2003 || Socorro || LINEAR || — || align=right | 1.2 km || 
|-id=187 bgcolor=#fefefe
| 223187 ||  || — || January 5, 2003 || Socorro || LINEAR || — || align=right | 1.4 km || 
|-id=188 bgcolor=#fefefe
| 223188 ||  || — || January 5, 2003 || Socorro || LINEAR || — || align=right | 1.1 km || 
|-id=189 bgcolor=#fefefe
| 223189 ||  || — || January 5, 2003 || Socorro || LINEAR || NYS || align=right | 1.2 km || 
|-id=190 bgcolor=#fefefe
| 223190 ||  || — || January 5, 2003 || Socorro || LINEAR || — || align=right | 1.2 km || 
|-id=191 bgcolor=#fefefe
| 223191 ||  || — || January 5, 2003 || Socorro || LINEAR || MAS || align=right | 1.4 km || 
|-id=192 bgcolor=#fefefe
| 223192 ||  || — || January 8, 2003 || Socorro || LINEAR || FLO || align=right data-sort-value="0.99" | 990 m || 
|-id=193 bgcolor=#fefefe
| 223193 ||  || — || January 8, 2003 || Socorro || LINEAR || NYS || align=right data-sort-value="0.86" | 860 m || 
|-id=194 bgcolor=#E9E9E9
| 223194 ||  || — || January 24, 2003 || La Silla || A. Boattini, H. Scholl || — || align=right | 1.8 km || 
|-id=195 bgcolor=#fefefe
| 223195 ||  || — || January 26, 2003 || Anderson Mesa || LONEOS || V || align=right data-sort-value="0.97" | 970 m || 
|-id=196 bgcolor=#fefefe
| 223196 ||  || — || January 26, 2003 || Haleakala || NEAT || — || align=right | 1.3 km || 
|-id=197 bgcolor=#fefefe
| 223197 ||  || — || January 27, 2003 || Anderson Mesa || LONEOS || V || align=right | 1.1 km || 
|-id=198 bgcolor=#fefefe
| 223198 ||  || — || January 27, 2003 || Anderson Mesa || LONEOS || NYS || align=right | 1.4 km || 
|-id=199 bgcolor=#fefefe
| 223199 ||  || — || January 27, 2003 || Socorro || LINEAR || NYS || align=right | 2.9 km || 
|-id=200 bgcolor=#fefefe
| 223200 ||  || — || January 27, 2003 || Socorro || LINEAR || NYS || align=right data-sort-value="0.90" | 900 m || 
|}

223201–223300 

|-bgcolor=#fefefe
| 223201 ||  || — || January 27, 2003 || Socorro || LINEAR || — || align=right | 1.4 km || 
|-id=202 bgcolor=#fefefe
| 223202 ||  || — || January 27, 2003 || Socorro || LINEAR || — || align=right | 1.4 km || 
|-id=203 bgcolor=#E9E9E9
| 223203 ||  || — || January 27, 2003 || Socorro || LINEAR || — || align=right | 1.8 km || 
|-id=204 bgcolor=#fefefe
| 223204 ||  || — || January 27, 2003 || Socorro || LINEAR || NYS || align=right | 1.1 km || 
|-id=205 bgcolor=#fefefe
| 223205 ||  || — || January 27, 2003 || Socorro || LINEAR || NYS || align=right data-sort-value="0.90" | 900 m || 
|-id=206 bgcolor=#fefefe
| 223206 ||  || — || January 27, 2003 || Socorro || LINEAR || NYS || align=right | 1.1 km || 
|-id=207 bgcolor=#fefefe
| 223207 ||  || — || January 30, 2003 || Anderson Mesa || LONEOS || — || align=right | 1.3 km || 
|-id=208 bgcolor=#fefefe
| 223208 ||  || — || January 26, 2003 || Anderson Mesa || LONEOS || NYS || align=right data-sort-value="0.98" | 980 m || 
|-id=209 bgcolor=#fefefe
| 223209 ||  || — || January 27, 2003 || Anderson Mesa || LONEOS || NYS || align=right data-sort-value="0.94" | 940 m || 
|-id=210 bgcolor=#fefefe
| 223210 ||  || — || January 27, 2003 || Socorro || LINEAR || — || align=right | 1.2 km || 
|-id=211 bgcolor=#d6d6d6
| 223211 ||  || — || January 27, 2003 || Socorro || LINEAR || SHU3:2 || align=right | 6.8 km || 
|-id=212 bgcolor=#E9E9E9
| 223212 ||  || — || January 27, 2003 || Socorro || LINEAR || — || align=right | 1.8 km || 
|-id=213 bgcolor=#fefefe
| 223213 ||  || — || January 28, 2003 || Palomar || NEAT || V || align=right | 1.1 km || 
|-id=214 bgcolor=#fefefe
| 223214 ||  || — || January 30, 2003 || Anderson Mesa || LONEOS || NYS || align=right data-sort-value="0.79" | 790 m || 
|-id=215 bgcolor=#fefefe
| 223215 ||  || — || January 29, 2003 || Palomar || NEAT || — || align=right | 1.3 km || 
|-id=216 bgcolor=#E9E9E9
| 223216 ||  || — || January 31, 2003 || Socorro || LINEAR || — || align=right | 1.4 km || 
|-id=217 bgcolor=#fefefe
| 223217 ||  || — || January 31, 2003 || Socorro || LINEAR || NYS || align=right | 1.3 km || 
|-id=218 bgcolor=#E9E9E9
| 223218 ||  || — || February 1, 2003 || Socorro || LINEAR || — || align=right | 1.4 km || 
|-id=219 bgcolor=#fefefe
| 223219 ||  || — || February 2, 2003 || Socorro || LINEAR || ERI || align=right | 2.3 km || 
|-id=220 bgcolor=#E9E9E9
| 223220 ||  || — || February 6, 2003 || Socorro || LINEAR || — || align=right | 1.9 km || 
|-id=221 bgcolor=#fefefe
| 223221 ||  || — || February 3, 2003 || Anderson Mesa || LONEOS || — || align=right | 1.1 km || 
|-id=222 bgcolor=#fefefe
| 223222 || 2003 DY || — || February 21, 2003 || Palomar || NEAT || NYS || align=right data-sort-value="0.87" | 870 m || 
|-id=223 bgcolor=#fefefe
| 223223 ||  || — || February 21, 2003 || Palomar || NEAT || — || align=right | 1.3 km || 
|-id=224 bgcolor=#fefefe
| 223224 ||  || — || February 21, 2003 || Kvistaberg || UDAS || NYS || align=right | 1.3 km || 
|-id=225 bgcolor=#E9E9E9
| 223225 ||  || — || February 25, 2003 || Kleť || J. Tichá, M. Tichý || — || align=right | 1.8 km || 
|-id=226 bgcolor=#fefefe
| 223226 ||  || — || February 26, 2003 || Haleakala || NEAT || — || align=right | 1.0 km || 
|-id=227 bgcolor=#fefefe
| 223227 ||  || — || February 24, 2003 || Haleakala || NEAT || — || align=right | 1.5 km || 
|-id=228 bgcolor=#E9E9E9
| 223228 ||  || — || February 21, 2003 || Palomar || NEAT || — || align=right | 3.9 km || 
|-id=229 bgcolor=#fefefe
| 223229 ||  || — || February 19, 2003 || Palomar || NEAT || — || align=right | 1.4 km || 
|-id=230 bgcolor=#fefefe
| 223230 ||  || — || February 23, 2003 || Anderson Mesa || LONEOS || — || align=right | 2.2 km || 
|-id=231 bgcolor=#fefefe
| 223231 ||  || — || February 28, 2003 || Socorro || LINEAR || H || align=right | 1.1 km || 
|-id=232 bgcolor=#E9E9E9
| 223232 ||  || — || February 22, 2003 || Palomar || NEAT || — || align=right | 1.6 km || 
|-id=233 bgcolor=#E9E9E9
| 223233 ||  || — || March 6, 2003 || Anderson Mesa || LONEOS || — || align=right | 1.6 km || 
|-id=234 bgcolor=#E9E9E9
| 223234 ||  || — || March 6, 2003 || Socorro || LINEAR || — || align=right | 2.0 km || 
|-id=235 bgcolor=#E9E9E9
| 223235 ||  || — || March 6, 2003 || Socorro || LINEAR || BRG || align=right | 2.2 km || 
|-id=236 bgcolor=#E9E9E9
| 223236 ||  || — || March 7, 2003 || Kitt Peak || Spacewatch || — || align=right | 1.1 km || 
|-id=237 bgcolor=#E9E9E9
| 223237 ||  || — || March 7, 2003 || Socorro || LINEAR || RAF || align=right | 1.3 km || 
|-id=238 bgcolor=#C2FFFF
| 223238 ||  || — || March 10, 2003 || Kitt Peak || Spacewatch || L4 || align=right | 11 km || 
|-id=239 bgcolor=#E9E9E9
| 223239 ||  || — || March 8, 2003 || Anderson Mesa || LONEOS || MAR || align=right | 1.8 km || 
|-id=240 bgcolor=#E9E9E9
| 223240 ||  || — || March 8, 2003 || Socorro || LINEAR || EUN || align=right | 2.2 km || 
|-id=241 bgcolor=#E9E9E9
| 223241 ||  || — || March 26, 2003 || Palomar || NEAT || HNS || align=right | 1.5 km || 
|-id=242 bgcolor=#E9E9E9
| 223242 ||  || — || March 23, 2003 || Kitt Peak || Spacewatch || — || align=right | 1.8 km || 
|-id=243 bgcolor=#E9E9E9
| 223243 ||  || — || March 24, 2003 || Kitt Peak || Spacewatch || — || align=right | 1.00 km || 
|-id=244 bgcolor=#E9E9E9
| 223244 ||  || — || March 24, 2003 || Haleakala || NEAT || — || align=right | 2.5 km || 
|-id=245 bgcolor=#E9E9E9
| 223245 ||  || — || March 23, 2003 || Kitt Peak || Spacewatch || MAR || align=right | 1.5 km || 
|-id=246 bgcolor=#E9E9E9
| 223246 ||  || — || March 23, 2003 || Kitt Peak || Spacewatch || — || align=right | 2.1 km || 
|-id=247 bgcolor=#E9E9E9
| 223247 ||  || — || March 25, 2003 || Catalina || CSS || RAF || align=right | 1.4 km || 
|-id=248 bgcolor=#E9E9E9
| 223248 ||  || — || March 26, 2003 || Palomar || NEAT || — || align=right | 1.6 km || 
|-id=249 bgcolor=#E9E9E9
| 223249 ||  || — || March 26, 2003 || Palomar || NEAT || KON || align=right | 3.1 km || 
|-id=250 bgcolor=#E9E9E9
| 223250 ||  || — || March 26, 2003 || Palomar || NEAT || EUN || align=right | 2.3 km || 
|-id=251 bgcolor=#C2FFFF
| 223251 ||  || — || March 26, 2003 || Kitt Peak || Spacewatch || L4ERY || align=right | 18 km || 
|-id=252 bgcolor=#E9E9E9
| 223252 ||  || — || March 26, 2003 || Palomar || NEAT || — || align=right | 2.8 km || 
|-id=253 bgcolor=#E9E9E9
| 223253 ||  || — || March 27, 2003 || Kitt Peak || Spacewatch || — || align=right | 2.9 km || 
|-id=254 bgcolor=#E9E9E9
| 223254 ||  || — || March 27, 2003 || Palomar || NEAT || — || align=right | 3.3 km || 
|-id=255 bgcolor=#E9E9E9
| 223255 ||  || — || March 27, 2003 || Kitt Peak || Spacewatch || EUN || align=right | 4.2 km || 
|-id=256 bgcolor=#E9E9E9
| 223256 ||  || — || March 28, 2003 || Catalina || CSS || — || align=right | 2.3 km || 
|-id=257 bgcolor=#E9E9E9
| 223257 ||  || — || March 28, 2003 || Catalina || CSS || — || align=right | 2.4 km || 
|-id=258 bgcolor=#E9E9E9
| 223258 ||  || — || March 29, 2003 || Anderson Mesa || LONEOS || EUN || align=right | 2.0 km || 
|-id=259 bgcolor=#E9E9E9
| 223259 ||  || — || March 30, 2003 || Anderson Mesa || LONEOS || — || align=right | 2.7 km || 
|-id=260 bgcolor=#E9E9E9
| 223260 ||  || — || March 31, 2003 || Anderson Mesa || LONEOS || — || align=right | 2.8 km || 
|-id=261 bgcolor=#E9E9E9
| 223261 ||  || — || March 25, 2003 || Haleakala || NEAT || — || align=right | 4.0 km || 
|-id=262 bgcolor=#E9E9E9
| 223262 ||  || — || March 31, 2003 || Kitt Peak || Spacewatch || KON || align=right | 4.6 km || 
|-id=263 bgcolor=#E9E9E9
| 223263 ||  || — || March 30, 2003 || Kitt Peak || M. W. Buie || CLO || align=right | 4.0 km || 
|-id=264 bgcolor=#E9E9E9
| 223264 ||  || — || March 24, 2003 || Kitt Peak || Spacewatch || — || align=right | 2.1 km || 
|-id=265 bgcolor=#d6d6d6
| 223265 ||  || — || April 2, 2003 || Haleakala || NEAT || — || align=right | 6.4 km || 
|-id=266 bgcolor=#E9E9E9
| 223266 ||  || — || April 3, 2003 || Anderson Mesa || LONEOS || — || align=right | 3.5 km || 
|-id=267 bgcolor=#E9E9E9
| 223267 ||  || — || April 3, 2003 || Anderson Mesa || LONEOS || — || align=right | 1.9 km || 
|-id=268 bgcolor=#C2FFFF
| 223268 ||  || — || April 7, 2003 || Palomar || NEAT || L4 || align=right | 15 km || 
|-id=269 bgcolor=#fefefe
| 223269 ||  || — || April 6, 2003 || Desert Eagle || W. K. Y. Yeung || NYS || align=right | 1.1 km || 
|-id=270 bgcolor=#E9E9E9
| 223270 ||  || — || April 7, 2003 || Kitt Peak || Spacewatch || — || align=right | 2.0 km || 
|-id=271 bgcolor=#E9E9E9
| 223271 ||  || — || April 1, 2003 || Cerro Tololo || DLS || — || align=right | 1.8 km || 
|-id=272 bgcolor=#C2FFFF
| 223272 ||  || — || April 1, 2003 || Cerro Tololo || DLS || L4 || align=right | 13 km || 
|-id=273 bgcolor=#E9E9E9
| 223273 ||  || — || April 7, 2003 || Palomar || NEAT || — || align=right | 1.4 km || 
|-id=274 bgcolor=#fefefe
| 223274 ||  || — || April 9, 2003 || Socorro || LINEAR || H || align=right data-sort-value="0.80" | 800 m || 
|-id=275 bgcolor=#E9E9E9
| 223275 ||  || — || April 9, 2003 || Palomar || NEAT || EUN || align=right | 1.6 km || 
|-id=276 bgcolor=#E9E9E9
| 223276 ||  || — || April 8, 2003 || Palomar || NEAT || — || align=right | 1.8 km || 
|-id=277 bgcolor=#E9E9E9
| 223277 ||  || — || April 4, 2003 || Kitt Peak || Spacewatch || — || align=right | 2.1 km || 
|-id=278 bgcolor=#E9E9E9
| 223278 ||  || — || April 1, 2003 || Kitt Peak || M. W. Buie || — || align=right | 2.4 km || 
|-id=279 bgcolor=#E9E9E9
| 223279 ||  || — || April 24, 2003 || Anderson Mesa || LONEOS || — || align=right | 3.0 km || 
|-id=280 bgcolor=#E9E9E9
| 223280 ||  || — || April 24, 2003 || Anderson Mesa || LONEOS || — || align=right | 4.7 km || 
|-id=281 bgcolor=#E9E9E9
| 223281 ||  || — || April 25, 2003 || Anderson Mesa || LONEOS || — || align=right | 4.2 km || 
|-id=282 bgcolor=#E9E9E9
| 223282 ||  || — || April 25, 2003 || Anderson Mesa || LONEOS || — || align=right | 2.4 km || 
|-id=283 bgcolor=#E9E9E9
| 223283 ||  || — || April 26, 2003 || Kitt Peak || Spacewatch || — || align=right | 2.1 km || 
|-id=284 bgcolor=#E9E9E9
| 223284 ||  || — || April 26, 2003 || Haleakala || NEAT || — || align=right | 2.1 km || 
|-id=285 bgcolor=#E9E9E9
| 223285 ||  || — || April 28, 2003 || Anderson Mesa || LONEOS || GEF || align=right | 1.7 km || 
|-id=286 bgcolor=#fefefe
| 223286 ||  || — || April 29, 2003 || Socorro || LINEAR || H || align=right data-sort-value="0.74" | 740 m || 
|-id=287 bgcolor=#E9E9E9
| 223287 ||  || — || April 27, 2003 || Anderson Mesa || LONEOS || — || align=right | 4.0 km || 
|-id=288 bgcolor=#E9E9E9
| 223288 ||  || — || April 27, 2003 || Anderson Mesa || LONEOS || — || align=right | 2.3 km || 
|-id=289 bgcolor=#E9E9E9
| 223289 ||  || — || April 28, 2003 || Socorro || LINEAR || — || align=right | 2.6 km || 
|-id=290 bgcolor=#E9E9E9
| 223290 ||  || — || April 29, 2003 || Kitt Peak || Spacewatch || — || align=right | 2.9 km || 
|-id=291 bgcolor=#fefefe
| 223291 ||  || — || April 30, 2003 || Kitt Peak || Spacewatch || H || align=right | 1.1 km || 
|-id=292 bgcolor=#E9E9E9
| 223292 ||  || — || April 29, 2003 || Socorro || LINEAR || — || align=right | 2.6 km || 
|-id=293 bgcolor=#E9E9E9
| 223293 ||  || — || April 24, 2003 || Anderson Mesa || LONEOS || — || align=right | 2.1 km || 
|-id=294 bgcolor=#E9E9E9
| 223294 ||  || — || April 27, 2003 || Anderson Mesa || LONEOS || — || align=right | 2.2 km || 
|-id=295 bgcolor=#E9E9E9
| 223295 ||  || — || May 2, 2003 || Kitt Peak || Spacewatch || — || align=right | 1.8 km || 
|-id=296 bgcolor=#E9E9E9
| 223296 ||  || — || May 1, 2003 || Kitt Peak || Spacewatch || NEM || align=right | 3.3 km || 
|-id=297 bgcolor=#E9E9E9
| 223297 ||  || — || May 5, 2003 || Socorro || LINEAR || — || align=right | 4.6 km || 
|-id=298 bgcolor=#d6d6d6
| 223298 ||  || — || May 1, 2003 || Socorro || LINEAR || — || align=right | 4.3 km || 
|-id=299 bgcolor=#E9E9E9
| 223299 ||  || — || May 27, 2003 || Kitt Peak || Spacewatch || — || align=right | 2.2 km || 
|-id=300 bgcolor=#E9E9E9
| 223300 ||  || — || May 25, 2003 || Kitt Peak || Spacewatch || HEN || align=right | 1.5 km || 
|}

223301–223400 

|-bgcolor=#d6d6d6
| 223301 ||  || — || July 2, 2003 || Socorro || LINEAR || — || align=right | 5.5 km || 
|-id=302 bgcolor=#d6d6d6
| 223302 ||  || — || July 4, 2003 || Anderson Mesa || LONEOS || EUP || align=right | 10 km || 
|-id=303 bgcolor=#d6d6d6
| 223303 ||  || — || July 3, 2003 || Kitt Peak || Spacewatch || URS || align=right | 4.8 km || 
|-id=304 bgcolor=#d6d6d6
| 223304 ||  || — || July 3, 2003 || Kitt Peak || Spacewatch || 629 || align=right | 2.4 km || 
|-id=305 bgcolor=#d6d6d6
| 223305 ||  || — || July 7, 2003 || Kitt Peak || Spacewatch || — || align=right | 3.9 km || 
|-id=306 bgcolor=#d6d6d6
| 223306 ||  || — || July 22, 2003 || Campo Imperatore || CINEOS || — || align=right | 5.1 km || 
|-id=307 bgcolor=#d6d6d6
| 223307 ||  || — || July 22, 2003 || Palomar || NEAT || TIR || align=right | 4.0 km || 
|-id=308 bgcolor=#d6d6d6
| 223308 ||  || — || July 21, 2003 || Palomar || NEAT || TIR || align=right | 4.1 km || 
|-id=309 bgcolor=#d6d6d6
| 223309 ||  || — || July 23, 2003 || Palomar || NEAT || — || align=right | 4.0 km || 
|-id=310 bgcolor=#d6d6d6
| 223310 ||  || — || July 29, 2003 || Campo Imperatore || CINEOS || EOS || align=right | 3.6 km || 
|-id=311 bgcolor=#d6d6d6
| 223311 ||  || — || July 24, 2003 || Palomar || NEAT || — || align=right | 4.6 km || 
|-id=312 bgcolor=#d6d6d6
| 223312 ||  || — || August 2, 2003 || Haleakala || NEAT || EOS || align=right | 2.9 km || 
|-id=313 bgcolor=#d6d6d6
| 223313 ||  || — || August 1, 2003 || Socorro || LINEAR || HYG || align=right | 5.5 km || 
|-id=314 bgcolor=#d6d6d6
| 223314 ||  || — || August 2, 2003 || Haleakala || NEAT || EOS || align=right | 3.2 km || 
|-id=315 bgcolor=#d6d6d6
| 223315 ||  || — || August 20, 2003 || Campo Imperatore || CINEOS || — || align=right | 3.1 km || 
|-id=316 bgcolor=#d6d6d6
| 223316 ||  || — || August 21, 2003 || Campo Imperatore || CINEOS || LIX || align=right | 6.6 km || 
|-id=317 bgcolor=#d6d6d6
| 223317 ||  || — || August 21, 2003 || Socorro || LINEAR || EUP || align=right | 5.9 km || 
|-id=318 bgcolor=#d6d6d6
| 223318 ||  || — || August 22, 2003 || Haleakala || NEAT || LIX || align=right | 6.3 km || 
|-id=319 bgcolor=#d6d6d6
| 223319 ||  || — || August 22, 2003 || Palomar || NEAT || — || align=right | 3.5 km || 
|-id=320 bgcolor=#d6d6d6
| 223320 ||  || — || August 22, 2003 || Palomar || NEAT || VER || align=right | 3.6 km || 
|-id=321 bgcolor=#d6d6d6
| 223321 ||  || — || August 20, 2003 || Palomar || NEAT || — || align=right | 7.7 km || 
|-id=322 bgcolor=#d6d6d6
| 223322 ||  || — || August 22, 2003 || Palomar || NEAT || — || align=right | 4.5 km || 
|-id=323 bgcolor=#d6d6d6
| 223323 ||  || — || August 22, 2003 || Campo Imperatore || CINEOS || — || align=right | 4.3 km || 
|-id=324 bgcolor=#d6d6d6
| 223324 ||  || — || August 23, 2003 || Palomar || NEAT || THM || align=right | 4.8 km || 
|-id=325 bgcolor=#d6d6d6
| 223325 ||  || — || August 20, 2003 || Palomar || NEAT || — || align=right | 2.9 km || 
|-id=326 bgcolor=#d6d6d6
| 223326 ||  || — || August 22, 2003 || Palomar || NEAT || HYG || align=right | 3.6 km || 
|-id=327 bgcolor=#d6d6d6
| 223327 ||  || — || August 23, 2003 || Socorro || LINEAR || — || align=right | 5.9 km || 
|-id=328 bgcolor=#d6d6d6
| 223328 ||  || — || August 23, 2003 || Socorro || LINEAR || — || align=right | 3.9 km || 
|-id=329 bgcolor=#d6d6d6
| 223329 ||  || — || August 23, 2003 || Socorro || LINEAR || TIR || align=right | 4.8 km || 
|-id=330 bgcolor=#d6d6d6
| 223330 ||  || — || August 23, 2003 || Socorro || LINEAR || — || align=right | 6.6 km || 
|-id=331 bgcolor=#d6d6d6
| 223331 ||  || — || August 25, 2003 || Palomar || NEAT || — || align=right | 3.7 km || 
|-id=332 bgcolor=#d6d6d6
| 223332 ||  || — || August 25, 2003 || Socorro || LINEAR || — || align=right | 4.7 km || 
|-id=333 bgcolor=#d6d6d6
| 223333 ||  || — || August 23, 2003 || Palomar || NEAT || — || align=right | 3.0 km || 
|-id=334 bgcolor=#d6d6d6
| 223334 ||  || — || August 26, 2003 || Črni Vrh || H. Mikuž || EOS || align=right | 2.5 km || 
|-id=335 bgcolor=#d6d6d6
| 223335 ||  || — || August 24, 2003 || Socorro || LINEAR || HYG || align=right | 4.4 km || 
|-id=336 bgcolor=#d6d6d6
| 223336 ||  || — || August 24, 2003 || Socorro || LINEAR || — || align=right | 3.3 km || 
|-id=337 bgcolor=#d6d6d6
| 223337 ||  || — || August 24, 2003 || Socorro || LINEAR || — || align=right | 5.3 km || 
|-id=338 bgcolor=#d6d6d6
| 223338 ||  || — || August 24, 2003 || Socorro || LINEAR || — || align=right | 4.5 km || 
|-id=339 bgcolor=#d6d6d6
| 223339 ||  || — || August 26, 2003 || Cerro Tololo || M. W. Buie || — || align=right | 4.3 km || 
|-id=340 bgcolor=#d6d6d6
| 223340 ||  || — || August 28, 2003 || Haleakala || NEAT || HYG || align=right | 4.4 km || 
|-id=341 bgcolor=#d6d6d6
| 223341 ||  || — || August 28, 2003 || Haleakala || NEAT || HYG || align=right | 4.7 km || 
|-id=342 bgcolor=#d6d6d6
| 223342 ||  || — || August 30, 2003 || Kitt Peak || Spacewatch || THM || align=right | 3.2 km || 
|-id=343 bgcolor=#d6d6d6
| 223343 ||  || — || August 28, 2003 || Palomar || NEAT || — || align=right | 4.5 km || 
|-id=344 bgcolor=#d6d6d6
| 223344 ||  || — || August 31, 2003 || Socorro || LINEAR || — || align=right | 3.2 km || 
|-id=345 bgcolor=#d6d6d6
| 223345 ||  || — || August 31, 2003 || Socorro || LINEAR || EOS || align=right | 3.3 km || 
|-id=346 bgcolor=#d6d6d6
| 223346 ||  || — || August 27, 2003 || Palomar || NEAT || — || align=right | 4.9 km || 
|-id=347 bgcolor=#d6d6d6
| 223347 ||  || — || August 31, 2003 || Socorro || LINEAR || — || align=right | 5.7 km || 
|-id=348 bgcolor=#d6d6d6
| 223348 ||  || — || September 3, 2003 || Kvistaberg || UDAS || ALA || align=right | 4.8 km || 
|-id=349 bgcolor=#d6d6d6
| 223349 ||  || — || September 15, 2003 || Wrightwood || J. W. Young || — || align=right | 5.1 km || 
|-id=350 bgcolor=#d6d6d6
| 223350 ||  || — || September 15, 2003 || Palomar || NEAT || EOS || align=right | 5.6 km || 
|-id=351 bgcolor=#d6d6d6
| 223351 ||  || — || September 15, 2003 || Palomar || NEAT || — || align=right | 3.9 km || 
|-id=352 bgcolor=#d6d6d6
| 223352 ||  || — || September 15, 2003 || Palomar || NEAT || — || align=right | 3.1 km || 
|-id=353 bgcolor=#d6d6d6
| 223353 ||  || — || September 15, 2003 || Anderson Mesa || LONEOS || — || align=right | 6.1 km || 
|-id=354 bgcolor=#d6d6d6
| 223354 ||  || — || September 13, 2003 || Haleakala || NEAT || — || align=right | 5.3 km || 
|-id=355 bgcolor=#d6d6d6
| 223355 ||  || — || September 13, 2003 || Haleakala || NEAT || EOS || align=right | 3.4 km || 
|-id=356 bgcolor=#d6d6d6
| 223356 ||  || — || September 14, 2003 || Palomar || NEAT || THM || align=right | 3.9 km || 
|-id=357 bgcolor=#d6d6d6
| 223357 ||  || — || September 15, 2003 || Palomar || NEAT || EUP || align=right | 7.2 km || 
|-id=358 bgcolor=#d6d6d6
| 223358 || 2003 SJ || — || September 16, 2003 || Palomar || NEAT || — || align=right | 3.3 km || 
|-id=359 bgcolor=#d6d6d6
| 223359 ||  || — || September 16, 2003 || Palomar || NEAT || — || align=right | 5.6 km || 
|-id=360 bgcolor=#d6d6d6
| 223360 Švankmajer ||  ||  || September 16, 2003 || Kleť || KLENOT || EOS || align=right | 3.5 km || 
|-id=361 bgcolor=#d6d6d6
| 223361 ||  || — || September 17, 2003 || Palomar || NEAT || — || align=right | 6.3 km || 
|-id=362 bgcolor=#d6d6d6
| 223362 ||  || — || September 16, 2003 || Kitt Peak || Spacewatch || — || align=right | 4.0 km || 
|-id=363 bgcolor=#d6d6d6
| 223363 ||  || — || September 16, 2003 || Kitt Peak || Spacewatch || — || align=right | 3.1 km || 
|-id=364 bgcolor=#d6d6d6
| 223364 ||  || — || September 18, 2003 || Campo Imperatore || CINEOS || — || align=right | 5.2 km || 
|-id=365 bgcolor=#d6d6d6
| 223365 ||  || — || September 16, 2003 || Kitt Peak || Spacewatch || — || align=right | 5.1 km || 
|-id=366 bgcolor=#d6d6d6
| 223366 ||  || — || September 16, 2003 || Palomar || NEAT || — || align=right | 6.6 km || 
|-id=367 bgcolor=#d6d6d6
| 223367 ||  || — || September 18, 2003 || Socorro || LINEAR || — || align=right | 6.1 km || 
|-id=368 bgcolor=#d6d6d6
| 223368 ||  || — || September 16, 2003 || Palomar || NEAT || HYG || align=right | 5.5 km || 
|-id=369 bgcolor=#d6d6d6
| 223369 ||  || — || September 16, 2003 || Palomar || NEAT || VER || align=right | 4.0 km || 
|-id=370 bgcolor=#d6d6d6
| 223370 ||  || — || September 16, 2003 || Anderson Mesa || LONEOS || URS || align=right | 5.8 km || 
|-id=371 bgcolor=#d6d6d6
| 223371 ||  || — || September 16, 2003 || Anderson Mesa || LONEOS || URS || align=right | 5.4 km || 
|-id=372 bgcolor=#d6d6d6
| 223372 ||  || — || September 19, 2003 || Palomar || NEAT || — || align=right | 2.9 km || 
|-id=373 bgcolor=#d6d6d6
| 223373 ||  || — || September 16, 2003 || Kitt Peak || Spacewatch || VER || align=right | 4.6 km || 
|-id=374 bgcolor=#d6d6d6
| 223374 ||  || — || September 16, 2003 || Anderson Mesa || LONEOS || — || align=right | 4.3 km || 
|-id=375 bgcolor=#d6d6d6
| 223375 ||  || — || September 16, 2003 || Anderson Mesa || LONEOS || LIX || align=right | 5.3 km || 
|-id=376 bgcolor=#d6d6d6
| 223376 ||  || — || September 16, 2003 || Anderson Mesa || LONEOS || — || align=right | 6.2 km || 
|-id=377 bgcolor=#d6d6d6
| 223377 ||  || — || September 16, 2003 || Kitt Peak || Spacewatch || VER || align=right | 5.3 km || 
|-id=378 bgcolor=#d6d6d6
| 223378 ||  || — || September 17, 2003 || Anderson Mesa || LONEOS || — || align=right | 5.8 km || 
|-id=379 bgcolor=#d6d6d6
| 223379 ||  || — || September 17, 2003 || Anderson Mesa || LONEOS || VER || align=right | 5.3 km || 
|-id=380 bgcolor=#d6d6d6
| 223380 ||  || — || September 17, 2003 || Kitt Peak || Spacewatch || HYG || align=right | 5.1 km || 
|-id=381 bgcolor=#d6d6d6
| 223381 ||  || — || September 17, 2003 || Kitt Peak || Spacewatch || — || align=right | 5.4 km || 
|-id=382 bgcolor=#d6d6d6
| 223382 ||  || — || September 18, 2003 || Anderson Mesa || LONEOS || — || align=right | 6.0 km || 
|-id=383 bgcolor=#d6d6d6
| 223383 ||  || — || September 17, 2003 || Haleakala || NEAT || — || align=right | 7.4 km || 
|-id=384 bgcolor=#d6d6d6
| 223384 ||  || — || September 18, 2003 || Kitt Peak || Spacewatch || HYG || align=right | 5.2 km || 
|-id=385 bgcolor=#d6d6d6
| 223385 ||  || — || September 18, 2003 || Kitt Peak || Spacewatch || — || align=right | 4.8 km || 
|-id=386 bgcolor=#d6d6d6
| 223386 ||  || — || September 19, 2003 || Kitt Peak || Spacewatch || — || align=right | 5.7 km || 
|-id=387 bgcolor=#fefefe
| 223387 ||  || — || September 16, 2003 || Palomar || NEAT || H || align=right | 1.0 km || 
|-id=388 bgcolor=#d6d6d6
| 223388 ||  || — || September 16, 2003 || Kitt Peak || Spacewatch || — || align=right | 4.8 km || 
|-id=389 bgcolor=#d6d6d6
| 223389 ||  || — || September 18, 2003 || Campo Imperatore || CINEOS || — || align=right | 2.9 km || 
|-id=390 bgcolor=#d6d6d6
| 223390 ||  || — || September 18, 2003 || Kitt Peak || Spacewatch || — || align=right | 3.8 km || 
|-id=391 bgcolor=#d6d6d6
| 223391 ||  || — || September 18, 2003 || Palomar || NEAT || HYG || align=right | 3.5 km || 
|-id=392 bgcolor=#d6d6d6
| 223392 ||  || — || September 19, 2003 || Kitt Peak || Spacewatch || — || align=right | 4.9 km || 
|-id=393 bgcolor=#d6d6d6
| 223393 ||  || — || September 20, 2003 || Palomar || NEAT || EOS || align=right | 3.8 km || 
|-id=394 bgcolor=#d6d6d6
| 223394 ||  || — || September 20, 2003 || Kitt Peak || Spacewatch || — || align=right | 6.8 km || 
|-id=395 bgcolor=#d6d6d6
| 223395 ||  || — || September 16, 2003 || Anderson Mesa || LONEOS || — || align=right | 5.0 km || 
|-id=396 bgcolor=#d6d6d6
| 223396 ||  || — || September 16, 2003 || Palomar || NEAT || EOS || align=right | 3.6 km || 
|-id=397 bgcolor=#d6d6d6
| 223397 ||  || — || September 16, 2003 || Kitt Peak || Spacewatch || — || align=right | 7.4 km || 
|-id=398 bgcolor=#d6d6d6
| 223398 ||  || — || September 17, 2003 || Kitt Peak || Spacewatch || VER || align=right | 3.4 km || 
|-id=399 bgcolor=#d6d6d6
| 223399 ||  || — || September 17, 2003 || Kitt Peak || Spacewatch || — || align=right | 4.8 km || 
|-id=400 bgcolor=#d6d6d6
| 223400 ||  || — || September 18, 2003 || Kitt Peak || Spacewatch || — || align=right | 5.2 km || 
|}

223401–223500 

|-bgcolor=#d6d6d6
| 223401 ||  || — || September 19, 2003 || Palomar || NEAT || ALA || align=right | 6.6 km || 
|-id=402 bgcolor=#d6d6d6
| 223402 ||  || — || September 20, 2003 || Socorro || LINEAR || — || align=right | 5.4 km || 
|-id=403 bgcolor=#d6d6d6
| 223403 ||  || — || September 21, 2003 || Socorro || LINEAR || — || align=right | 4.4 km || 
|-id=404 bgcolor=#d6d6d6
| 223404 ||  || — || September 16, 2003 || Kitt Peak || Spacewatch || — || align=right | 4.9 km || 
|-id=405 bgcolor=#d6d6d6
| 223405 ||  || — || September 19, 2003 || Anderson Mesa || LONEOS || ALA || align=right | 3.6 km || 
|-id=406 bgcolor=#d6d6d6
| 223406 ||  || — || September 20, 2003 || Socorro || LINEAR || HYG || align=right | 3.1 km || 
|-id=407 bgcolor=#d6d6d6
| 223407 ||  || — || September 21, 2003 || Kitt Peak || Spacewatch || K-2 || align=right | 2.5 km || 
|-id=408 bgcolor=#d6d6d6
| 223408 ||  || — || September 16, 2003 || Anderson Mesa || LONEOS || — || align=right | 4.2 km || 
|-id=409 bgcolor=#d6d6d6
| 223409 ||  || — || September 23, 2003 || Haleakala || NEAT || HYG || align=right | 3.1 km || 
|-id=410 bgcolor=#d6d6d6
| 223410 ||  || — || September 18, 2003 || Palomar || NEAT || THM || align=right | 2.7 km || 
|-id=411 bgcolor=#d6d6d6
| 223411 ||  || — || September 20, 2003 || Kitt Peak || Spacewatch || EOS || align=right | 3.2 km || 
|-id=412 bgcolor=#d6d6d6
| 223412 ||  || — || September 21, 2003 || Kitt Peak || Spacewatch || EOS || align=right | 6.1 km || 
|-id=413 bgcolor=#d6d6d6
| 223413 ||  || — || September 21, 2003 || Kitt Peak || Spacewatch || URS || align=right | 4.8 km || 
|-id=414 bgcolor=#d6d6d6
| 223414 ||  || — || September 21, 2003 || Kitt Peak || Spacewatch || — || align=right | 3.9 km || 
|-id=415 bgcolor=#d6d6d6
| 223415 ||  || — || September 21, 2003 || Anderson Mesa || LONEOS || — || align=right | 6.3 km || 
|-id=416 bgcolor=#d6d6d6
| 223416 ||  || — || September 22, 2003 || Anderson Mesa || LONEOS || THM || align=right | 3.3 km || 
|-id=417 bgcolor=#d6d6d6
| 223417 ||  || — || September 23, 2003 || Palomar || NEAT || — || align=right | 3.8 km || 
|-id=418 bgcolor=#d6d6d6
| 223418 ||  || — || September 23, 2003 || Palomar || NEAT || — || align=right | 5.7 km || 
|-id=419 bgcolor=#d6d6d6
| 223419 ||  || — || September 25, 2003 || Palomar || NEAT || — || align=right | 5.1 km || 
|-id=420 bgcolor=#d6d6d6
| 223420 ||  || — || September 26, 2003 || Palomar || NEAT || — || align=right | 6.8 km || 
|-id=421 bgcolor=#d6d6d6
| 223421 ||  || — || September 28, 2003 || Desert Eagle || W. K. Y. Yeung || — || align=right | 3.3 km || 
|-id=422 bgcolor=#d6d6d6
| 223422 ||  || — || September 24, 2003 || Haleakala || NEAT || — || align=right | 4.4 km || 
|-id=423 bgcolor=#d6d6d6
| 223423 ||  || — || September 26, 2003 || Socorro || LINEAR || THM || align=right | 3.1 km || 
|-id=424 bgcolor=#d6d6d6
| 223424 ||  || — || September 26, 2003 || Socorro || LINEAR || 7:4 || align=right | 6.6 km || 
|-id=425 bgcolor=#d6d6d6
| 223425 ||  || — || September 27, 2003 || Kitt Peak || Spacewatch || — || align=right | 3.4 km || 
|-id=426 bgcolor=#d6d6d6
| 223426 ||  || — || September 28, 2003 || Socorro || LINEAR || — || align=right | 4.6 km || 
|-id=427 bgcolor=#d6d6d6
| 223427 ||  || — || September 28, 2003 || Socorro || LINEAR || KOR || align=right | 1.9 km || 
|-id=428 bgcolor=#d6d6d6
| 223428 ||  || — || September 29, 2003 || Socorro || LINEAR || HYG || align=right | 4.6 km || 
|-id=429 bgcolor=#d6d6d6
| 223429 ||  || — || September 27, 2003 || Kitt Peak || Spacewatch || HYG || align=right | 3.4 km || 
|-id=430 bgcolor=#d6d6d6
| 223430 ||  || — || September 29, 2003 || Kitt Peak || Spacewatch || — || align=right | 3.6 km || 
|-id=431 bgcolor=#d6d6d6
| 223431 ||  || — || September 28, 2003 || Socorro || LINEAR || EUP || align=right | 5.5 km || 
|-id=432 bgcolor=#d6d6d6
| 223432 ||  || — || September 30, 2003 || Socorro || LINEAR || LIX || align=right | 6.1 km || 
|-id=433 bgcolor=#d6d6d6
| 223433 ||  || — || September 30, 2003 || Socorro || LINEAR || — || align=right | 5.1 km || 
|-id=434 bgcolor=#d6d6d6
| 223434 ||  || — || September 17, 2003 || Kitt Peak || Spacewatch || — || align=right | 4.6 km || 
|-id=435 bgcolor=#d6d6d6
| 223435 ||  || — || September 19, 2003 || Kitt Peak || Spacewatch || EOS || align=right | 2.8 km || 
|-id=436 bgcolor=#d6d6d6
| 223436 ||  || — || September 20, 2003 || Socorro || LINEAR || URS || align=right | 6.0 km || 
|-id=437 bgcolor=#d6d6d6
| 223437 ||  || — || September 20, 2003 || Socorro || LINEAR || — || align=right | 5.1 km || 
|-id=438 bgcolor=#d6d6d6
| 223438 ||  || — || September 20, 2003 || Kitt Peak || Spacewatch || URS || align=right | 4.7 km || 
|-id=439 bgcolor=#d6d6d6
| 223439 ||  || — || September 20, 2003 || Kitt Peak || Spacewatch || — || align=right | 4.7 km || 
|-id=440 bgcolor=#d6d6d6
| 223440 ||  || — || September 27, 2003 || Socorro || LINEAR || — || align=right | 4.3 km || 
|-id=441 bgcolor=#d6d6d6
| 223441 ||  || — || September 29, 2003 || Anderson Mesa || LONEOS || LIX || align=right | 6.7 km || 
|-id=442 bgcolor=#d6d6d6
| 223442 ||  || — || September 18, 2003 || Haleakala || NEAT || — || align=right | 3.5 km || 
|-id=443 bgcolor=#d6d6d6
| 223443 ||  || — || September 16, 2003 || Anderson Mesa || LONEOS || — || align=right | 4.9 km || 
|-id=444 bgcolor=#d6d6d6
| 223444 ||  || — || September 28, 2003 || Socorro || LINEAR || ALA || align=right | 5.6 km || 
|-id=445 bgcolor=#d6d6d6
| 223445 ||  || — || September 27, 2003 || Socorro || LINEAR || HYG || align=right | 3.9 km || 
|-id=446 bgcolor=#d6d6d6
| 223446 ||  || — || September 29, 2003 || Kitt Peak || Spacewatch || HYG || align=right | 3.9 km || 
|-id=447 bgcolor=#d6d6d6
| 223447 ||  || — || September 26, 2003 || Apache Point || SDSS || — || align=right | 3.1 km || 
|-id=448 bgcolor=#d6d6d6
| 223448 ||  || — || September 17, 2003 || Anderson Mesa || LONEOS || — || align=right | 3.0 km || 
|-id=449 bgcolor=#d6d6d6
| 223449 ||  || — || October 15, 2003 || Palomar || NEAT || — || align=right | 6.4 km || 
|-id=450 bgcolor=#d6d6d6
| 223450 ||  || — || October 15, 2003 || Anderson Mesa || LONEOS || — || align=right | 3.7 km || 
|-id=451 bgcolor=#d6d6d6
| 223451 ||  || — || October 15, 2003 || Palomar || NEAT || THM || align=right | 3.7 km || 
|-id=452 bgcolor=#d6d6d6
| 223452 ||  || — || October 15, 2003 || Anderson Mesa || LONEOS || — || align=right | 7.7 km || 
|-id=453 bgcolor=#d6d6d6
| 223453 ||  || — || October 1, 2003 || Kitt Peak || Spacewatch || — || align=right | 5.0 km || 
|-id=454 bgcolor=#d6d6d6
| 223454 || 2003 UW || — || October 16, 2003 || Kitt Peak || Spacewatch || — || align=right | 4.1 km || 
|-id=455 bgcolor=#d6d6d6
| 223455 ||  || — || October 18, 2003 || Kitt Peak || Spacewatch || — || align=right | 2.9 km || 
|-id=456 bgcolor=#FFC2E0
| 223456 ||  || — || October 20, 2003 || Kitt Peak || Spacewatch || AMO || align=right data-sort-value="0.77" | 770 m || 
|-id=457 bgcolor=#d6d6d6
| 223457 ||  || — || October 17, 2003 || Kitt Peak || Spacewatch || — || align=right | 5.5 km || 
|-id=458 bgcolor=#d6d6d6
| 223458 ||  || — || October 18, 2003 || Palomar || NEAT || — || align=right | 5.9 km || 
|-id=459 bgcolor=#d6d6d6
| 223459 ||  || — || October 16, 2003 || Palomar || NEAT || EUP || align=right | 6.4 km || 
|-id=460 bgcolor=#d6d6d6
| 223460 ||  || — || October 16, 2003 || Anderson Mesa || LONEOS || EUP || align=right | 4.6 km || 
|-id=461 bgcolor=#d6d6d6
| 223461 ||  || — || October 18, 2003 || Kitt Peak || Spacewatch || THB || align=right | 4.6 km || 
|-id=462 bgcolor=#d6d6d6
| 223462 ||  || — || October 18, 2003 || Haleakala || NEAT || — || align=right | 6.7 km || 
|-id=463 bgcolor=#d6d6d6
| 223463 ||  || — || October 19, 2003 || Anderson Mesa || LONEOS || — || align=right | 8.2 km || 
|-id=464 bgcolor=#d6d6d6
| 223464 ||  || — || October 20, 2003 || Socorro || LINEAR || HYG || align=right | 4.5 km || 
|-id=465 bgcolor=#d6d6d6
| 223465 ||  || — || October 19, 2003 || Kitt Peak || Spacewatch || — || align=right | 4.7 km || 
|-id=466 bgcolor=#d6d6d6
| 223466 ||  || — || October 20, 2003 || Palomar || NEAT || SYL7:4 || align=right | 5.7 km || 
|-id=467 bgcolor=#d6d6d6
| 223467 ||  || — || October 21, 2003 || Socorro || LINEAR || — || align=right | 6.6 km || 
|-id=468 bgcolor=#d6d6d6
| 223468 ||  || — || October 21, 2003 || Kitt Peak || Spacewatch || HYG || align=right | 5.2 km || 
|-id=469 bgcolor=#d6d6d6
| 223469 ||  || — || October 22, 2003 || Kitt Peak || Spacewatch || — || align=right | 4.7 km || 
|-id=470 bgcolor=#d6d6d6
| 223470 ||  || — || October 24, 2003 || Socorro || LINEAR || — || align=right | 5.7 km || 
|-id=471 bgcolor=#d6d6d6
| 223471 ||  || — || October 25, 2003 || Socorro || LINEAR || HYG || align=right | 4.6 km || 
|-id=472 bgcolor=#d6d6d6
| 223472 ||  || — || October 17, 2003 || Palomar || NEAT || — || align=right | 5.5 km || 
|-id=473 bgcolor=#d6d6d6
| 223473 ||  || — || October 25, 2003 || Socorro || LINEAR || ELF || align=right | 6.5 km || 
|-id=474 bgcolor=#d6d6d6
| 223474 ||  || — || October 22, 2003 || Apache Point || SDSS || — || align=right | 3.4 km || 
|-id=475 bgcolor=#d6d6d6
| 223475 ||  || — || November 14, 2003 || Palomar || NEAT || LUT || align=right | 7.3 km || 
|-id=476 bgcolor=#fefefe
| 223476 ||  || — || November 20, 2003 || Kitt Peak || Spacewatch || — || align=right | 1.2 km || 
|-id=477 bgcolor=#d6d6d6
| 223477 ||  || — || November 19, 2003 || Kitt Peak || Spacewatch || 7:4 || align=right | 6.4 km || 
|-id=478 bgcolor=#fefefe
| 223478 ||  || — || November 21, 2003 || Socorro || LINEAR || — || align=right data-sort-value="0.96" | 960 m || 
|-id=479 bgcolor=#d6d6d6
| 223479 ||  || — || November 26, 2003 || Kitt Peak || Spacewatch || SYL7:4 || align=right | 7.6 km || 
|-id=480 bgcolor=#d6d6d6
| 223480 ||  || — || December 4, 2003 || Socorro || LINEAR || LIX || align=right | 5.5 km || 
|-id=481 bgcolor=#d6d6d6
| 223481 ||  || — || December 17, 2003 || Črni Vrh || Črni Vrh || EUP || align=right | 6.9 km || 
|-id=482 bgcolor=#d6d6d6
| 223482 ||  || — || December 18, 2003 || Catalina || CSS || HIL3:2 || align=right | 7.4 km || 
|-id=483 bgcolor=#FA8072
| 223483 ||  || — || December 18, 2003 || Socorro || LINEAR || — || align=right | 1.1 km || 
|-id=484 bgcolor=#fefefe
| 223484 ||  || — || December 19, 2003 || Socorro || LINEAR || — || align=right | 1.4 km || 
|-id=485 bgcolor=#fefefe
| 223485 ||  || — || December 18, 2003 || Socorro || LINEAR || — || align=right | 1.2 km || 
|-id=486 bgcolor=#fefefe
| 223486 ||  || — || December 19, 2003 || Socorro || LINEAR || — || align=right | 1.1 km || 
|-id=487 bgcolor=#fefefe
| 223487 ||  || — || December 23, 2003 || Socorro || LINEAR || — || align=right | 1.1 km || 
|-id=488 bgcolor=#fefefe
| 223488 ||  || — || December 28, 2003 || Socorro || LINEAR || — || align=right | 1.0 km || 
|-id=489 bgcolor=#fefefe
| 223489 ||  || — || December 18, 2003 || Socorro || LINEAR || — || align=right | 1.1 km || 
|-id=490 bgcolor=#fefefe
| 223490 ||  || — || December 23, 2003 || Socorro || LINEAR || — || align=right | 1.5 km || 
|-id=491 bgcolor=#fefefe
| 223491 ||  || — || January 16, 2004 || Palomar || NEAT || — || align=right data-sort-value="0.95" | 950 m || 
|-id=492 bgcolor=#d6d6d6
| 223492 ||  || — || January 18, 2004 || Palomar || NEAT || SHU3:2 || align=right | 7.7 km || 
|-id=493 bgcolor=#fefefe
| 223493 ||  || — || January 22, 2004 || Socorro || LINEAR || V || align=right | 1.1 km || 
|-id=494 bgcolor=#fefefe
| 223494 ||  || — || January 22, 2004 || Socorro || LINEAR || — || align=right | 1.1 km || 
|-id=495 bgcolor=#fefefe
| 223495 ||  || — || January 22, 2004 || Socorro || LINEAR || — || align=right | 1.1 km || 
|-id=496 bgcolor=#fefefe
| 223496 ||  || — || January 21, 2004 || Socorro || LINEAR || — || align=right data-sort-value="0.67" | 670 m || 
|-id=497 bgcolor=#fefefe
| 223497 ||  || — || January 26, 2004 || Anderson Mesa || LONEOS || — || align=right | 1.2 km || 
|-id=498 bgcolor=#fefefe
| 223498 ||  || — || January 26, 2004 || Anderson Mesa || LONEOS || — || align=right | 1.2 km || 
|-id=499 bgcolor=#fefefe
| 223499 ||  || — || January 28, 2004 || Socorro || LINEAR || — || align=right | 3.4 km || 
|-id=500 bgcolor=#fefefe
| 223500 ||  || — || January 27, 2004 || Kitt Peak || Spacewatch || V || align=right data-sort-value="0.82" | 820 m || 
|}

223501–223600 

|-bgcolor=#fefefe
| 223501 ||  || — || January 26, 2004 || Anderson Mesa || LONEOS || — || align=right | 1.1 km || 
|-id=502 bgcolor=#fefefe
| 223502 ||  || — || January 28, 2004 || Catalina || CSS || — || align=right data-sort-value="0.89" | 890 m || 
|-id=503 bgcolor=#fefefe
| 223503 ||  || — || January 28, 2004 || Catalina || CSS || — || align=right | 1.3 km || 
|-id=504 bgcolor=#fefefe
| 223504 ||  || — || January 30, 2004 || Socorro || LINEAR || — || align=right | 1.8 km || 
|-id=505 bgcolor=#fefefe
| 223505 ||  || — || January 29, 2004 || Socorro || LINEAR || — || align=right | 1.3 km || 
|-id=506 bgcolor=#fefefe
| 223506 ||  || — || January 16, 2004 || Kitt Peak || Spacewatch || — || align=right | 1.4 km || 
|-id=507 bgcolor=#fefefe
| 223507 ||  || — || February 11, 2004 || Kitt Peak || Spacewatch || — || align=right | 1.0 km || 
|-id=508 bgcolor=#fefefe
| 223508 ||  || — || February 11, 2004 || Kitt Peak || Spacewatch || — || align=right data-sort-value="0.82" | 820 m || 
|-id=509 bgcolor=#fefefe
| 223509 ||  || — || February 11, 2004 || Palomar || NEAT || — || align=right | 1.2 km || 
|-id=510 bgcolor=#fefefe
| 223510 ||  || — || February 11, 2004 || Catalina || CSS || — || align=right | 1.4 km || 
|-id=511 bgcolor=#fefefe
| 223511 ||  || — || February 13, 2004 || Desert Eagle || W. K. Y. Yeung || — || align=right | 1.3 km || 
|-id=512 bgcolor=#fefefe
| 223512 ||  || — || February 11, 2004 || Palomar || NEAT || — || align=right | 1.3 km || 
|-id=513 bgcolor=#fefefe
| 223513 ||  || — || February 13, 2004 || Kitt Peak || Spacewatch || FLO || align=right data-sort-value="0.69" | 690 m || 
|-id=514 bgcolor=#fefefe
| 223514 ||  || — || February 13, 2004 || Desert Eagle || W. K. Y. Yeung || — || align=right | 1.3 km || 
|-id=515 bgcolor=#fefefe
| 223515 ||  || — || February 10, 2004 || Palomar || NEAT || — || align=right | 1.4 km || 
|-id=516 bgcolor=#fefefe
| 223516 ||  || — || February 11, 2004 || Kitt Peak || Spacewatch || FLO || align=right | 1.3 km || 
|-id=517 bgcolor=#fefefe
| 223517 ||  || — || February 11, 2004 || Palomar || NEAT || FLO || align=right | 1.4 km || 
|-id=518 bgcolor=#fefefe
| 223518 ||  || — || February 13, 2004 || Palomar || NEAT || — || align=right | 1.6 km || 
|-id=519 bgcolor=#fefefe
| 223519 ||  || — || February 14, 2004 || Catalina || CSS || — || align=right | 1.0 km || 
|-id=520 bgcolor=#fefefe
| 223520 ||  || — || February 15, 2004 || Catalina || CSS || — || align=right | 1.4 km || 
|-id=521 bgcolor=#fefefe
| 223521 ||  || — || February 15, 2004 || Catalina || CSS || — || align=right | 1.4 km || 
|-id=522 bgcolor=#fefefe
| 223522 ||  || — || February 13, 2004 || Anderson Mesa || LONEOS || FLO || align=right | 1.1 km || 
|-id=523 bgcolor=#fefefe
| 223523 ||  || — || February 17, 2004 || Kitt Peak || Spacewatch || — || align=right | 1.1 km || 
|-id=524 bgcolor=#fefefe
| 223524 ||  || — || February 19, 2004 || Socorro || LINEAR || — || align=right | 3.0 km || 
|-id=525 bgcolor=#fefefe
| 223525 ||  || — || February 18, 2004 || Socorro || LINEAR || PHO || align=right | 3.7 km || 
|-id=526 bgcolor=#fefefe
| 223526 ||  || — || February 16, 2004 || Kitt Peak || Spacewatch || — || align=right data-sort-value="0.97" | 970 m || 
|-id=527 bgcolor=#fefefe
| 223527 ||  || — || February 21, 2004 || Sandlot || Sandlot Obs. || V || align=right | 1.1 km || 
|-id=528 bgcolor=#fefefe
| 223528 ||  || — || February 18, 2004 || Haleakala || NEAT || FLO || align=right | 1.3 km || 
|-id=529 bgcolor=#fefefe
| 223529 ||  || — || February 19, 2004 || Socorro || LINEAR || — || align=right | 1.3 km || 
|-id=530 bgcolor=#fefefe
| 223530 ||  || — || February 23, 2004 || Socorro || LINEAR || NYS || align=right | 1.0 km || 
|-id=531 bgcolor=#fefefe
| 223531 ||  || — || February 22, 2004 || Kitt Peak || Spacewatch || MAS || align=right data-sort-value="0.80" | 800 m || 
|-id=532 bgcolor=#fefefe
| 223532 ||  || — || March 11, 2004 || Palomar || NEAT || V || align=right | 1.1 km || 
|-id=533 bgcolor=#fefefe
| 223533 ||  || — || March 13, 2004 || Palomar || NEAT || FLO || align=right | 1.2 km || 
|-id=534 bgcolor=#fefefe
| 223534 ||  || — || March 11, 2004 || Palomar || NEAT || — || align=right | 1.2 km || 
|-id=535 bgcolor=#fefefe
| 223535 ||  || — || March 11, 2004 || Palomar || NEAT || — || align=right | 1.6 km || 
|-id=536 bgcolor=#fefefe
| 223536 ||  || — || March 12, 2004 || Palomar || NEAT || — || align=right | 1.6 km || 
|-id=537 bgcolor=#fefefe
| 223537 ||  || — || March 14, 2004 || Catalina || CSS || — || align=right | 3.6 km || 
|-id=538 bgcolor=#fefefe
| 223538 ||  || — || March 15, 2004 || Desert Eagle || W. K. Y. Yeung || NYS || align=right | 3.1 km || 
|-id=539 bgcolor=#fefefe
| 223539 ||  || — || March 13, 2004 || Palomar || NEAT || — || align=right | 1.2 km || 
|-id=540 bgcolor=#fefefe
| 223540 ||  || — || March 15, 2004 || Catalina || CSS || NYS || align=right data-sort-value="0.91" | 910 m || 
|-id=541 bgcolor=#fefefe
| 223541 ||  || — || March 15, 2004 || Kitt Peak || Spacewatch || NYS || align=right data-sort-value="0.97" | 970 m || 
|-id=542 bgcolor=#fefefe
| 223542 ||  || — || March 15, 2004 || Catalina || CSS || NYS || align=right | 2.5 km || 
|-id=543 bgcolor=#fefefe
| 223543 ||  || — || March 15, 2004 || Catalina || CSS || NYS || align=right | 1.1 km || 
|-id=544 bgcolor=#fefefe
| 223544 ||  || — || March 15, 2004 || Socorro || LINEAR || ERI || align=right | 2.1 km || 
|-id=545 bgcolor=#fefefe
| 223545 ||  || — || March 15, 2004 || Palomar || NEAT || — || align=right | 1.3 km || 
|-id=546 bgcolor=#fefefe
| 223546 ||  || — || March 13, 2004 || Palomar || NEAT || — || align=right data-sort-value="0.86" | 860 m || 
|-id=547 bgcolor=#fefefe
| 223547 ||  || — || March 15, 2004 || Socorro || LINEAR || — || align=right | 1.1 km || 
|-id=548 bgcolor=#fefefe
| 223548 ||  || — || March 15, 2004 || Catalina || CSS || MAS || align=right | 1.00 km || 
|-id=549 bgcolor=#fefefe
| 223549 ||  || — || March 15, 2004 || Catalina || CSS || — || align=right data-sort-value="0.88" | 880 m || 
|-id=550 bgcolor=#fefefe
| 223550 ||  || — || March 15, 2004 || Catalina || CSS || NYS || align=right data-sort-value="0.93" | 930 m || 
|-id=551 bgcolor=#fefefe
| 223551 ||  || — || March 15, 2004 || Catalina || CSS || MAS || align=right data-sort-value="0.99" | 990 m || 
|-id=552 bgcolor=#fefefe
| 223552 ||  || — || March 15, 2004 || Kitt Peak || Spacewatch || NYS || align=right data-sort-value="0.91" | 910 m || 
|-id=553 bgcolor=#fefefe
| 223553 ||  || — || March 15, 2004 || Catalina || CSS || MAS || align=right | 1.0 km || 
|-id=554 bgcolor=#fefefe
| 223554 ||  || — || March 15, 2004 || Catalina || CSS || — || align=right | 1.3 km || 
|-id=555 bgcolor=#fefefe
| 223555 ||  || — || March 15, 2004 || Catalina || CSS || NYS || align=right data-sort-value="0.87" | 870 m || 
|-id=556 bgcolor=#fefefe
| 223556 ||  || — || March 15, 2004 || Kitt Peak || Spacewatch || NYS || align=right data-sort-value="0.86" | 860 m || 
|-id=557 bgcolor=#fefefe
| 223557 ||  || — || March 14, 2004 || Kitt Peak || Spacewatch || FLO || align=right data-sort-value="0.87" | 870 m || 
|-id=558 bgcolor=#fefefe
| 223558 ||  || — || March 15, 2004 || Catalina || CSS || — || align=right | 1.5 km || 
|-id=559 bgcolor=#fefefe
| 223559 ||  || — || March 15, 2004 || Kitt Peak || Spacewatch || V || align=right data-sort-value="0.65" | 650 m || 
|-id=560 bgcolor=#fefefe
| 223560 ||  || — || March 15, 2004 || Kitt Peak || Spacewatch || NYS || align=right data-sort-value="0.85" | 850 m || 
|-id=561 bgcolor=#fefefe
| 223561 ||  || — || March 11, 2004 || Palomar || NEAT || — || align=right | 1.1 km || 
|-id=562 bgcolor=#fefefe
| 223562 ||  || — || March 14, 2004 || Kitt Peak || Spacewatch || V || align=right data-sort-value="0.99" | 990 m || 
|-id=563 bgcolor=#fefefe
| 223563 ||  || — || March 16, 2004 || Socorro || LINEAR || — || align=right | 1.4 km || 
|-id=564 bgcolor=#fefefe
| 223564 ||  || — || March 16, 2004 || Kitt Peak || Spacewatch || — || align=right | 1.0 km || 
|-id=565 bgcolor=#fefefe
| 223565 ||  || — || March 16, 2004 || Kitt Peak || Spacewatch || — || align=right | 1.8 km || 
|-id=566 bgcolor=#fefefe
| 223566 Petignat ||  ||  || March 22, 2004 || Vicques || M. Ory || — || align=right | 1.00 km || 
|-id=567 bgcolor=#fefefe
| 223567 ||  || — || March 16, 2004 || Kitt Peak || Spacewatch || — || align=right data-sort-value="0.99" | 990 m || 
|-id=568 bgcolor=#fefefe
| 223568 ||  || — || March 16, 2004 || Catalina || CSS || V || align=right | 1.3 km || 
|-id=569 bgcolor=#fefefe
| 223569 ||  || — || March 17, 2004 || Kitt Peak || Spacewatch || — || align=right data-sort-value="0.91" | 910 m || 
|-id=570 bgcolor=#fefefe
| 223570 ||  || — || March 16, 2004 || Socorro || LINEAR || — || align=right data-sort-value="0.99" | 990 m || 
|-id=571 bgcolor=#fefefe
| 223571 ||  || — || March 17, 2004 || Kitt Peak || Spacewatch || — || align=right | 1.5 km || 
|-id=572 bgcolor=#fefefe
| 223572 ||  || — || March 17, 2004 || Socorro || LINEAR || — || align=right | 1.8 km || 
|-id=573 bgcolor=#fefefe
| 223573 ||  || — || March 18, 2004 || Socorro || LINEAR || NYS || align=right data-sort-value="0.87" | 870 m || 
|-id=574 bgcolor=#fefefe
| 223574 ||  || — || March 19, 2004 || Socorro || LINEAR || FLO || align=right | 1.1 km || 
|-id=575 bgcolor=#E9E9E9
| 223575 ||  || — || March 20, 2004 || Socorro || LINEAR || — || align=right | 1.9 km || 
|-id=576 bgcolor=#fefefe
| 223576 ||  || — || March 19, 2004 || Socorro || LINEAR || — || align=right | 1.2 km || 
|-id=577 bgcolor=#fefefe
| 223577 ||  || — || March 19, 2004 || Socorro || LINEAR || V || align=right | 1.0 km || 
|-id=578 bgcolor=#fefefe
| 223578 ||  || — || March 18, 2004 || Socorro || LINEAR || V || align=right data-sort-value="0.82" | 820 m || 
|-id=579 bgcolor=#fefefe
| 223579 ||  || — || March 18, 2004 || Socorro || LINEAR || — || align=right | 1.0 km || 
|-id=580 bgcolor=#fefefe
| 223580 ||  || — || March 17, 2004 || Socorro || LINEAR || MAS || align=right | 1.3 km || 
|-id=581 bgcolor=#fefefe
| 223581 ||  || — || March 20, 2004 || Socorro || LINEAR || V || align=right data-sort-value="0.95" | 950 m || 
|-id=582 bgcolor=#fefefe
| 223582 ||  || — || March 25, 2004 || Socorro || LINEAR || — || align=right data-sort-value="0.83" | 830 m || 
|-id=583 bgcolor=#fefefe
| 223583 ||  || — || March 20, 2004 || Socorro || LINEAR || — || align=right | 1.4 km || 
|-id=584 bgcolor=#fefefe
| 223584 ||  || — || March 23, 2004 || Kitt Peak || Spacewatch || — || align=right | 1.4 km || 
|-id=585 bgcolor=#fefefe
| 223585 ||  || — || March 24, 2004 || Anderson Mesa || LONEOS || ERI || align=right | 2.8 km || 
|-id=586 bgcolor=#fefefe
| 223586 ||  || — || March 22, 2004 || Socorro || LINEAR || — || align=right | 1.9 km || 
|-id=587 bgcolor=#fefefe
| 223587 ||  || — || March 27, 2004 || Socorro || LINEAR || MAS || align=right data-sort-value="0.81" | 810 m || 
|-id=588 bgcolor=#fefefe
| 223588 ||  || — || March 27, 2004 || Socorro || LINEAR || — || align=right | 1.3 km || 
|-id=589 bgcolor=#fefefe
| 223589 ||  || — || March 18, 2004 || Kitt Peak || Spacewatch || — || align=right data-sort-value="0.83" | 830 m || 
|-id=590 bgcolor=#fefefe
| 223590 ||  || — || April 9, 2004 || Siding Spring || SSS || — || align=right | 1.9 km || 
|-id=591 bgcolor=#fefefe
| 223591 ||  || — || April 15, 2004 || Desert Eagle || W. K. Y. Yeung || NYS || align=right data-sort-value="0.88" | 880 m || 
|-id=592 bgcolor=#E9E9E9
| 223592 ||  || — || April 10, 2004 || Palomar || NEAT || IAN || align=right | 1.6 km || 
|-id=593 bgcolor=#fefefe
| 223593 ||  || — || April 12, 2004 || Anderson Mesa || LONEOS || — || align=right data-sort-value="0.94" | 940 m || 
|-id=594 bgcolor=#fefefe
| 223594 ||  || — || April 12, 2004 || Palomar || NEAT || V || align=right data-sort-value="0.89" | 890 m || 
|-id=595 bgcolor=#fefefe
| 223595 ||  || — || April 13, 2004 || Palomar || NEAT || — || align=right | 1.3 km || 
|-id=596 bgcolor=#fefefe
| 223596 ||  || — || April 12, 2004 || Kitt Peak || Spacewatch || — || align=right data-sort-value="0.91" | 910 m || 
|-id=597 bgcolor=#fefefe
| 223597 ||  || — || April 12, 2004 || Kitt Peak || Spacewatch || — || align=right | 1.4 km || 
|-id=598 bgcolor=#fefefe
| 223598 ||  || — || April 12, 2004 || Kitt Peak || Spacewatch || — || align=right | 1.1 km || 
|-id=599 bgcolor=#fefefe
| 223599 ||  || — || April 15, 2004 || Anderson Mesa || LONEOS || — || align=right | 1.0 km || 
|-id=600 bgcolor=#fefefe
| 223600 ||  || — || April 14, 2004 || Anderson Mesa || LONEOS || — || align=right | 1.1 km || 
|}

223601–223700 

|-bgcolor=#fefefe
| 223601 ||  || — || April 11, 2004 || Palomar || NEAT || — || align=right data-sort-value="0.93" | 930 m || 
|-id=602 bgcolor=#fefefe
| 223602 ||  || — || April 14, 2004 || Kitt Peak || Spacewatch || MAS || align=right data-sort-value="0.90" | 900 m || 
|-id=603 bgcolor=#fefefe
| 223603 ||  || — || April 14, 2004 || Kitt Peak || Spacewatch || — || align=right | 1.2 km || 
|-id=604 bgcolor=#E9E9E9
| 223604 ||  || — || April 16, 2004 || Palomar || NEAT || — || align=right | 1.8 km || 
|-id=605 bgcolor=#fefefe
| 223605 ||  || — || April 16, 2004 || Kitt Peak || Spacewatch || NYS || align=right data-sort-value="0.84" | 840 m || 
|-id=606 bgcolor=#fefefe
| 223606 ||  || — || April 16, 2004 || Socorro || LINEAR || — || align=right | 1.2 km || 
|-id=607 bgcolor=#E9E9E9
| 223607 ||  || — || April 19, 2004 || Kitt Peak || Spacewatch || — || align=right | 1.2 km || 
|-id=608 bgcolor=#E9E9E9
| 223608 ||  || — || April 19, 2004 || Socorro || LINEAR || MIT || align=right | 4.1 km || 
|-id=609 bgcolor=#E9E9E9
| 223609 ||  || — || April 19, 2004 || Socorro || LINEAR || — || align=right | 1.2 km || 
|-id=610 bgcolor=#fefefe
| 223610 ||  || — || April 19, 2004 || Kitt Peak || Spacewatch || — || align=right | 1.5 km || 
|-id=611 bgcolor=#fefefe
| 223611 ||  || — || April 17, 2004 || Socorro || LINEAR || — || align=right | 1.5 km || 
|-id=612 bgcolor=#E9E9E9
| 223612 ||  || — || April 25, 2004 || Socorro || LINEAR || — || align=right | 1.5 km || 
|-id=613 bgcolor=#fefefe
| 223613 ||  || — || April 19, 2004 || Kitt Peak || Spacewatch || — || align=right | 1.0 km || 
|-id=614 bgcolor=#fefefe
| 223614 ||  || — || April 25, 2004 || Kitt Peak || Spacewatch || NYS || align=right data-sort-value="0.80" | 800 m || 
|-id=615 bgcolor=#C2FFFF
| 223615 ||  || — || April 28, 2004 || Kitt Peak || Spacewatch || L4 || align=right | 10 km || 
|-id=616 bgcolor=#E9E9E9
| 223616 ||  || — || May 8, 2004 || Palomar || NEAT || — || align=right | 2.5 km || 
|-id=617 bgcolor=#fefefe
| 223617 ||  || — || May 12, 2004 || Catalina || CSS || — || align=right | 1.6 km || 
|-id=618 bgcolor=#E9E9E9
| 223618 ||  || — || May 12, 2004 || Catalina || CSS || BRG || align=right | 2.0 km || 
|-id=619 bgcolor=#E9E9E9
| 223619 ||  || — || May 13, 2004 || Kitt Peak || Spacewatch || IAN || align=right | 1.2 km || 
|-id=620 bgcolor=#E9E9E9
| 223620 ||  || — || May 13, 2004 || Reedy Creek || J. Broughton || — || align=right | 1.7 km || 
|-id=621 bgcolor=#E9E9E9
| 223621 ||  || — || May 10, 2004 || Palomar || NEAT || — || align=right | 1.5 km || 
|-id=622 bgcolor=#E9E9E9
| 223622 ||  || — || May 10, 2004 || Palomar || NEAT || ADE || align=right | 4.1 km || 
|-id=623 bgcolor=#E9E9E9
| 223623 ||  || — || May 14, 2004 || Kitt Peak || Spacewatch || — || align=right | 1.7 km || 
|-id=624 bgcolor=#E9E9E9
| 223624 ||  || — || May 13, 2004 || Socorro || LINEAR || — || align=right | 3.1 km || 
|-id=625 bgcolor=#fefefe
| 223625 ||  || — || May 9, 2004 || Kitt Peak || Spacewatch || NYS || align=right | 2.0 km || 
|-id=626 bgcolor=#fefefe
| 223626 ||  || — || May 14, 2004 || Socorro || LINEAR || — || align=right | 1.7 km || 
|-id=627 bgcolor=#E9E9E9
| 223627 ||  || — || May 15, 2004 || Socorro || LINEAR || — || align=right | 1.4 km || 
|-id=628 bgcolor=#E9E9E9
| 223628 ||  || — || May 15, 2004 || Socorro || LINEAR || ADE || align=right | 3.2 km || 
|-id=629 bgcolor=#E9E9E9
| 223629 ||  || — || May 15, 2004 || Socorro || LINEAR || — || align=right | 1.4 km || 
|-id=630 bgcolor=#fefefe
| 223630 ||  || — || May 15, 2004 || Socorro || LINEAR || NYS || align=right data-sort-value="0.95" | 950 m || 
|-id=631 bgcolor=#C2FFFF
| 223631 ||  || — || May 9, 2004 || Kitt Peak || Spacewatch || L4 || align=right | 11 km || 
|-id=632 bgcolor=#E9E9E9
| 223632 ||  || — || May 14, 2004 || Palomar || NEAT || EUN || align=right | 1.7 km || 
|-id=633 bgcolor=#FA8072
| 223633 Rosnyaîné ||  ||  || May 17, 2004 || Saint-Sulpice || B. Christophe || — || align=right | 2.6 km || 
|-id=634 bgcolor=#E9E9E9
| 223634 ||  || — || May 18, 2004 || Socorro || LINEAR || — || align=right | 2.3 km || 
|-id=635 bgcolor=#E9E9E9
| 223635 ||  || — || May 19, 2004 || Socorro || LINEAR || — || align=right | 1.8 km || 
|-id=636 bgcolor=#fefefe
| 223636 ||  || — || May 21, 2004 || Kitt Peak || Spacewatch || — || align=right | 1.5 km || 
|-id=637 bgcolor=#E9E9E9
| 223637 ||  || — || May 22, 2004 || Catalina || CSS || — || align=right | 1.2 km || 
|-id=638 bgcolor=#fefefe
| 223638 ||  || — || May 21, 2004 || Socorro || LINEAR || V || align=right data-sort-value="0.94" | 940 m || 
|-id=639 bgcolor=#E9E9E9
| 223639 ||  || — || May 27, 2004 || Nogales || Tenagra II Obs. || ADE || align=right | 1.9 km || 
|-id=640 bgcolor=#E9E9E9
| 223640 ||  || — || June 9, 2004 || Siding Spring || SSS || — || align=right | 2.5 km || 
|-id=641 bgcolor=#E9E9E9
| 223641 ||  || — || June 12, 2004 || Socorro || LINEAR || JUN || align=right | 2.0 km || 
|-id=642 bgcolor=#E9E9E9
| 223642 ||  || — || June 11, 2004 || Kitt Peak || Spacewatch || — || align=right | 1.2 km || 
|-id=643 bgcolor=#E9E9E9
| 223643 ||  || — || June 14, 2004 || Kitt Peak || Spacewatch || MAR || align=right | 1.6 km || 
|-id=644 bgcolor=#E9E9E9
| 223644 || 2004 MG || — || June 16, 2004 || Socorro || LINEAR || MIT || align=right | 3.1 km || 
|-id=645 bgcolor=#E9E9E9
| 223645 ||  || — || June 17, 2004 || Palomar || NEAT || — || align=right | 1.2 km || 
|-id=646 bgcolor=#E9E9E9
| 223646 ||  || — || June 16, 2004 || Socorro || LINEAR || — || align=right | 2.2 km || 
|-id=647 bgcolor=#E9E9E9
| 223647 ||  || — || June 27, 2004 || Reedy Creek || J. Broughton || — || align=right | 2.9 km || 
|-id=648 bgcolor=#E9E9E9
| 223648 || 2004 NQ || — || July 10, 2004 || Pla D'Arguines || Pla D'Arguines Obs. || — || align=right | 3.2 km || 
|-id=649 bgcolor=#E9E9E9
| 223649 ||  || — || July 14, 2004 || Reedy Creek || J. Broughton || — || align=right | 1.6 km || 
|-id=650 bgcolor=#E9E9E9
| 223650 ||  || — || July 9, 2004 || Socorro || LINEAR || ADE || align=right | 3.1 km || 
|-id=651 bgcolor=#E9E9E9
| 223651 ||  || — || July 16, 2004 || Socorro || LINEAR || HNA || align=right | 2.7 km || 
|-id=652 bgcolor=#E9E9E9
| 223652 ||  || — || July 19, 2004 || Anderson Mesa || LONEOS || — || align=right | 2.4 km || 
|-id=653 bgcolor=#E9E9E9
| 223653 || 2004 PF || — || August 5, 2004 || Palomar || NEAT || GEF || align=right | 2.0 km || 
|-id=654 bgcolor=#E9E9E9
| 223654 ||  || — || August 7, 2004 || Palomar || NEAT || — || align=right | 3.4 km || 
|-id=655 bgcolor=#E9E9E9
| 223655 ||  || — || August 7, 2004 || Campo Imperatore || CINEOS || — || align=right | 2.4 km || 
|-id=656 bgcolor=#E9E9E9
| 223656 ||  || — || August 8, 2004 || Socorro || LINEAR || — || align=right | 4.5 km || 
|-id=657 bgcolor=#E9E9E9
| 223657 ||  || — || August 3, 2004 || Siding Spring || SSS || — || align=right | 2.2 km || 
|-id=658 bgcolor=#E9E9E9
| 223658 ||  || — || August 8, 2004 || Socorro || LINEAR || HNA || align=right | 3.4 km || 
|-id=659 bgcolor=#E9E9E9
| 223659 ||  || — || August 8, 2004 || Bergisch Gladbach || W. Bickel || AEO || align=right | 2.1 km || 
|-id=660 bgcolor=#E9E9E9
| 223660 ||  || — || August 6, 2004 || Palomar || NEAT || — || align=right | 2.9 km || 
|-id=661 bgcolor=#E9E9E9
| 223661 ||  || — || August 8, 2004 || Socorro || LINEAR || MRX || align=right | 1.7 km || 
|-id=662 bgcolor=#E9E9E9
| 223662 ||  || — || August 9, 2004 || Socorro || LINEAR || — || align=right | 3.4 km || 
|-id=663 bgcolor=#E9E9E9
| 223663 ||  || — || August 9, 2004 || Socorro || LINEAR || — || align=right | 3.7 km || 
|-id=664 bgcolor=#E9E9E9
| 223664 ||  || — || August 9, 2004 || Socorro || LINEAR || — || align=right | 3.5 km || 
|-id=665 bgcolor=#E9E9E9
| 223665 ||  || — || August 9, 2004 || Socorro || LINEAR || slow || align=right | 5.0 km || 
|-id=666 bgcolor=#E9E9E9
| 223666 ||  || — || August 9, 2004 || Socorro || LINEAR || — || align=right | 3.9 km || 
|-id=667 bgcolor=#E9E9E9
| 223667 ||  || — || August 6, 2004 || Palomar || NEAT || NEM || align=right | 3.4 km || 
|-id=668 bgcolor=#E9E9E9
| 223668 ||  || — || August 8, 2004 || Socorro || LINEAR || — || align=right | 2.5 km || 
|-id=669 bgcolor=#E9E9E9
| 223669 ||  || — || August 8, 2004 || Socorro || LINEAR || — || align=right | 3.3 km || 
|-id=670 bgcolor=#E9E9E9
| 223670 ||  || — || August 9, 2004 || Anderson Mesa || LONEOS || — || align=right | 3.3 km || 
|-id=671 bgcolor=#d6d6d6
| 223671 ||  || — || August 9, 2004 || Anderson Mesa || LONEOS || — || align=right | 2.9 km || 
|-id=672 bgcolor=#E9E9E9
| 223672 ||  || — || August 9, 2004 || Socorro || LINEAR || GEF || align=right | 1.8 km || 
|-id=673 bgcolor=#E9E9E9
| 223673 ||  || — || August 7, 2004 || Campo Imperatore || CINEOS || MRX || align=right | 1.3 km || 
|-id=674 bgcolor=#E9E9E9
| 223674 ||  || — || August 8, 2004 || Anderson Mesa || LONEOS || NEM || align=right | 3.5 km || 
|-id=675 bgcolor=#E9E9E9
| 223675 ||  || — || August 9, 2004 || Socorro || LINEAR || PAD || align=right | 3.4 km || 
|-id=676 bgcolor=#E9E9E9
| 223676 ||  || — || August 10, 2004 || Socorro || LINEAR || NEM || align=right | 3.1 km || 
|-id=677 bgcolor=#E9E9E9
| 223677 ||  || — || August 10, 2004 || Socorro || LINEAR || DOR || align=right | 3.9 km || 
|-id=678 bgcolor=#E9E9E9
| 223678 ||  || — || August 10, 2004 || Socorro || LINEAR || NEM || align=right | 2.9 km || 
|-id=679 bgcolor=#E9E9E9
| 223679 ||  || — || August 11, 2004 || Socorro || LINEAR || — || align=right | 3.7 km || 
|-id=680 bgcolor=#E9E9E9
| 223680 ||  || — || August 11, 2004 || Socorro || LINEAR || — || align=right | 3.0 km || 
|-id=681 bgcolor=#E9E9E9
| 223681 ||  || — || August 9, 2004 || Socorro || LINEAR || — || align=right | 2.8 km || 
|-id=682 bgcolor=#d6d6d6
| 223682 ||  || — || August 12, 2004 || Palomar || NEAT || — || align=right | 4.1 km || 
|-id=683 bgcolor=#E9E9E9
| 223683 ||  || — || August 11, 2004 || Reedy Creek || J. Broughton || CLO || align=right | 3.9 km || 
|-id=684 bgcolor=#E9E9E9
| 223684 ||  || — || August 11, 2004 || Palomar || NEAT || — || align=right | 3.4 km || 
|-id=685 bgcolor=#E9E9E9
| 223685 Hartopp ||  ||  || August 18, 2004 || Begues || J. Manteca || — || align=right | 4.0 km || 
|-id=686 bgcolor=#d6d6d6
| 223686 ||  || — || August 19, 2004 || Socorro || LINEAR || — || align=right | 3.3 km || 
|-id=687 bgcolor=#E9E9E9
| 223687 ||  || — || August 21, 2004 || Siding Spring || SSS || GEF || align=right | 1.9 km || 
|-id=688 bgcolor=#d6d6d6
| 223688 ||  || — || August 19, 2004 || Socorro || LINEAR || EUP || align=right | 8.0 km || 
|-id=689 bgcolor=#E9E9E9
| 223689 ||  || — || August 20, 2004 || Kitt Peak || Spacewatch || — || align=right | 2.3 km || 
|-id=690 bgcolor=#E9E9E9
| 223690 ||  || — || August 25, 2004 || Kitt Peak || Spacewatch || HOF || align=right | 2.7 km || 
|-id=691 bgcolor=#E9E9E9
| 223691 ||  || — || August 22, 2004 || Siding Spring || SSS || — || align=right | 3.4 km || 
|-id=692 bgcolor=#E9E9E9
| 223692 ||  || — || September 4, 2004 || Palomar || NEAT || — || align=right | 2.7 km || 
|-id=693 bgcolor=#E9E9E9
| 223693 ||  || — || September 7, 2004 || Kitt Peak || Spacewatch || AGN || align=right | 1.7 km || 
|-id=694 bgcolor=#E9E9E9
| 223694 ||  || — || September 7, 2004 || Kitt Peak || Spacewatch || — || align=right | 2.6 km || 
|-id=695 bgcolor=#fefefe
| 223695 ||  || — || September 8, 2004 || Socorro || LINEAR || H || align=right | 1.1 km || 
|-id=696 bgcolor=#E9E9E9
| 223696 ||  || — || September 6, 2004 || Palomar || NEAT || — || align=right | 2.8 km || 
|-id=697 bgcolor=#E9E9E9
| 223697 ||  || — || September 6, 2004 || Siding Spring || SSS || HOF || align=right | 3.6 km || 
|-id=698 bgcolor=#E9E9E9
| 223698 ||  || — || September 7, 2004 || Socorro || LINEAR || — || align=right | 3.0 km || 
|-id=699 bgcolor=#d6d6d6
| 223699 ||  || — || September 7, 2004 || Socorro || LINEAR || CHA || align=right | 3.2 km || 
|-id=700 bgcolor=#E9E9E9
| 223700 ||  || — || September 7, 2004 || Socorro || LINEAR || — || align=right | 3.5 km || 
|}

223701–223800 

|-bgcolor=#E9E9E9
| 223701 ||  || — || September 7, 2004 || Socorro || LINEAR || — || align=right | 2.5 km || 
|-id=702 bgcolor=#E9E9E9
| 223702 ||  || — || September 7, 2004 || Socorro || LINEAR || NEM || align=right | 3.6 km || 
|-id=703 bgcolor=#E9E9E9
| 223703 ||  || — || September 7, 2004 || Socorro || LINEAR || — || align=right | 3.3 km || 
|-id=704 bgcolor=#E9E9E9
| 223704 ||  || — || September 7, 2004 || Kitt Peak || Spacewatch || AGN || align=right | 1.6 km || 
|-id=705 bgcolor=#d6d6d6
| 223705 ||  || — || September 7, 2004 || Socorro || LINEAR || BRA || align=right | 2.7 km || 
|-id=706 bgcolor=#E9E9E9
| 223706 ||  || — || September 8, 2004 || Socorro || LINEAR || — || align=right | 3.6 km || 
|-id=707 bgcolor=#E9E9E9
| 223707 ||  || — || September 8, 2004 || Socorro || LINEAR || AST || align=right | 3.8 km || 
|-id=708 bgcolor=#E9E9E9
| 223708 ||  || — || September 8, 2004 || Socorro || LINEAR || — || align=right | 2.6 km || 
|-id=709 bgcolor=#E9E9E9
| 223709 ||  || — || September 8, 2004 || Socorro || LINEAR || — || align=right | 3.1 km || 
|-id=710 bgcolor=#E9E9E9
| 223710 ||  || — || September 8, 2004 || Socorro || LINEAR || — || align=right | 3.9 km || 
|-id=711 bgcolor=#E9E9E9
| 223711 ||  || — || September 8, 2004 || Socorro || LINEAR || — || align=right | 4.0 km || 
|-id=712 bgcolor=#d6d6d6
| 223712 ||  || — || September 8, 2004 || Palomar || NEAT || EOS || align=right | 2.9 km || 
|-id=713 bgcolor=#d6d6d6
| 223713 ||  || — || September 8, 2004 || Socorro || LINEAR || — || align=right | 2.8 km || 
|-id=714 bgcolor=#d6d6d6
| 223714 ||  || — || September 7, 2004 || Kitt Peak || Spacewatch || — || align=right | 3.2 km || 
|-id=715 bgcolor=#d6d6d6
| 223715 ||  || — || September 8, 2004 || Socorro || LINEAR || BRA || align=right | 2.3 km || 
|-id=716 bgcolor=#d6d6d6
| 223716 ||  || — || September 8, 2004 || Socorro || LINEAR || SAN || align=right | 2.1 km || 
|-id=717 bgcolor=#E9E9E9
| 223717 ||  || — || September 8, 2004 || Socorro || LINEAR || NEM || align=right | 2.3 km || 
|-id=718 bgcolor=#E9E9E9
| 223718 ||  || — || September 8, 2004 || Socorro || LINEAR || WIT || align=right | 1.7 km || 
|-id=719 bgcolor=#E9E9E9
| 223719 ||  || — || September 8, 2004 || Socorro || LINEAR || — || align=right | 3.3 km || 
|-id=720 bgcolor=#E9E9E9
| 223720 ||  || — || September 8, 2004 || Palomar || NEAT || — || align=right | 4.3 km || 
|-id=721 bgcolor=#d6d6d6
| 223721 ||  || — || September 8, 2004 || Palomar || NEAT || EOS || align=right | 3.3 km || 
|-id=722 bgcolor=#E9E9E9
| 223722 ||  || — || September 11, 2004 || Goodricke-Pigott || R. A. Tucker || — || align=right | 3.2 km || 
|-id=723 bgcolor=#E9E9E9
| 223723 ||  || — || September 8, 2004 || Socorro || LINEAR || — || align=right | 3.2 km || 
|-id=724 bgcolor=#d6d6d6
| 223724 ||  || — || September 7, 2004 || Socorro || LINEAR || KOR || align=right | 2.4 km || 
|-id=725 bgcolor=#E9E9E9
| 223725 ||  || — || September 7, 2004 || Socorro || LINEAR || — || align=right | 3.1 km || 
|-id=726 bgcolor=#E9E9E9
| 223726 ||  || — || September 7, 2004 || Socorro || LINEAR || MIS || align=right | 3.4 km || 
|-id=727 bgcolor=#E9E9E9
| 223727 ||  || — || September 7, 2004 || Socorro || LINEAR || NEM || align=right | 3.7 km || 
|-id=728 bgcolor=#E9E9E9
| 223728 ||  || — || September 7, 2004 || Socorro || LINEAR || — || align=right | 3.2 km || 
|-id=729 bgcolor=#E9E9E9
| 223729 ||  || — || September 7, 2004 || Kitt Peak || Spacewatch || AST || align=right | 2.4 km || 
|-id=730 bgcolor=#E9E9E9
| 223730 ||  || — || September 8, 2004 || Socorro || LINEAR || — || align=right | 3.6 km || 
|-id=731 bgcolor=#d6d6d6
| 223731 ||  || — || September 8, 2004 || Socorro || LINEAR || — || align=right | 2.7 km || 
|-id=732 bgcolor=#d6d6d6
| 223732 ||  || — || September 8, 2004 || Socorro || LINEAR || — || align=right | 4.3 km || 
|-id=733 bgcolor=#d6d6d6
| 223733 ||  || — || September 8, 2004 || Socorro || LINEAR || — || align=right | 4.0 km || 
|-id=734 bgcolor=#d6d6d6
| 223734 ||  || — || September 9, 2004 || Socorro || LINEAR || — || align=right | 4.0 km || 
|-id=735 bgcolor=#E9E9E9
| 223735 ||  || — || September 9, 2004 || Socorro || LINEAR || — || align=right | 2.9 km || 
|-id=736 bgcolor=#d6d6d6
| 223736 ||  || — || September 9, 2004 || Socorro || LINEAR || — || align=right | 4.0 km || 
|-id=737 bgcolor=#E9E9E9
| 223737 ||  || — || September 10, 2004 || Socorro || LINEAR || — || align=right | 3.5 km || 
|-id=738 bgcolor=#E9E9E9
| 223738 ||  || — || September 10, 2004 || Socorro || LINEAR || — || align=right | 2.0 km || 
|-id=739 bgcolor=#E9E9E9
| 223739 ||  || — || September 10, 2004 || Socorro || LINEAR || — || align=right | 3.3 km || 
|-id=740 bgcolor=#d6d6d6
| 223740 ||  || — || September 10, 2004 || Kitt Peak || Spacewatch || CHA || align=right | 2.3 km || 
|-id=741 bgcolor=#E9E9E9
| 223741 ||  || — || September 11, 2004 || Socorro || LINEAR || — || align=right | 3.0 km || 
|-id=742 bgcolor=#E9E9E9
| 223742 ||  || — || September 7, 2004 || Palomar || NEAT || — || align=right | 3.5 km || 
|-id=743 bgcolor=#E9E9E9
| 223743 ||  || — || September 10, 2004 || Socorro || LINEAR || CLO || align=right | 2.9 km || 
|-id=744 bgcolor=#d6d6d6
| 223744 ||  || — || September 10, 2004 || Socorro || LINEAR || — || align=right | 4.3 km || 
|-id=745 bgcolor=#E9E9E9
| 223745 ||  || — || September 10, 2004 || Socorro || LINEAR || — || align=right | 1.8 km || 
|-id=746 bgcolor=#E9E9E9
| 223746 ||  || — || September 10, 2004 || Socorro || LINEAR || — || align=right | 3.9 km || 
|-id=747 bgcolor=#E9E9E9
| 223747 ||  || — || September 10, 2004 || Socorro || LINEAR || — || align=right | 3.6 km || 
|-id=748 bgcolor=#E9E9E9
| 223748 ||  || — || September 10, 2004 || Socorro || LINEAR || DOR || align=right | 4.8 km || 
|-id=749 bgcolor=#E9E9E9
| 223749 ||  || — || September 10, 2004 || Socorro || LINEAR || GEF || align=right | 2.4 km || 
|-id=750 bgcolor=#E9E9E9
| 223750 ||  || — || September 10, 2004 || Socorro || LINEAR || GEF || align=right | 2.0 km || 
|-id=751 bgcolor=#E9E9E9
| 223751 ||  || — || September 10, 2004 || Socorro || LINEAR || GEFslow || align=right | 2.3 km || 
|-id=752 bgcolor=#d6d6d6
| 223752 ||  || — || September 10, 2004 || Socorro || LINEAR || — || align=right | 4.4 km || 
|-id=753 bgcolor=#E9E9E9
| 223753 ||  || — || September 10, 2004 || Socorro || LINEAR || INO || align=right | 2.1 km || 
|-id=754 bgcolor=#E9E9E9
| 223754 ||  || — || September 11, 2004 || Socorro || LINEAR || — || align=right | 2.6 km || 
|-id=755 bgcolor=#E9E9E9
| 223755 ||  || — || September 11, 2004 || Socorro || LINEAR || — || align=right | 4.4 km || 
|-id=756 bgcolor=#d6d6d6
| 223756 ||  || — || September 7, 2004 || Kitt Peak || Spacewatch || — || align=right | 4.0 km || 
|-id=757 bgcolor=#E9E9E9
| 223757 ||  || — || September 9, 2004 || Kitt Peak || Spacewatch || — || align=right | 2.2 km || 
|-id=758 bgcolor=#d6d6d6
| 223758 ||  || — || September 9, 2004 || Kitt Peak || Spacewatch || — || align=right | 2.6 km || 
|-id=759 bgcolor=#d6d6d6
| 223759 ||  || — || September 9, 2004 || Kitt Peak || Spacewatch || KOR || align=right | 1.7 km || 
|-id=760 bgcolor=#E9E9E9
| 223760 ||  || — || September 10, 2004 || Socorro || LINEAR || — || align=right | 3.0 km || 
|-id=761 bgcolor=#d6d6d6
| 223761 ||  || — || September 10, 2004 || Kitt Peak || Spacewatch || K-2 || align=right | 1.7 km || 
|-id=762 bgcolor=#E9E9E9
| 223762 ||  || — || September 10, 2004 || Kitt Peak || Spacewatch || HEN || align=right | 1.4 km || 
|-id=763 bgcolor=#E9E9E9
| 223763 ||  || — || September 10, 2004 || Kitt Peak || Spacewatch || — || align=right | 3.5 km || 
|-id=764 bgcolor=#E9E9E9
| 223764 ||  || — || September 6, 2004 || Palomar || NEAT || — || align=right | 4.1 km || 
|-id=765 bgcolor=#E9E9E9
| 223765 ||  || — || September 9, 2004 || Anderson Mesa || LONEOS || AGN || align=right | 1.8 km || 
|-id=766 bgcolor=#E9E9E9
| 223766 ||  || — || September 9, 2004 || Anderson Mesa || LONEOS || — || align=right | 2.9 km || 
|-id=767 bgcolor=#d6d6d6
| 223767 ||  || — || September 15, 2004 || Kitt Peak || Spacewatch || KAR || align=right | 1.4 km || 
|-id=768 bgcolor=#E9E9E9
| 223768 ||  || — || September 7, 2004 || Socorro || LINEAR || DOR || align=right | 5.4 km || 
|-id=769 bgcolor=#E9E9E9
| 223769 ||  || — || September 10, 2004 || Kitt Peak || Spacewatch || AGN || align=right | 1.5 km || 
|-id=770 bgcolor=#E9E9E9
| 223770 ||  || — || September 11, 2004 || Kitt Peak || Spacewatch || AGN || align=right | 1.7 km || 
|-id=771 bgcolor=#E9E9E9
| 223771 ||  || — || September 13, 2004 || Socorro || LINEAR || GEF || align=right | 2.1 km || 
|-id=772 bgcolor=#E9E9E9
| 223772 ||  || — || September 13, 2004 || Socorro || LINEAR || — || align=right | 3.8 km || 
|-id=773 bgcolor=#E9E9E9
| 223773 ||  || — || September 15, 2004 || Anderson Mesa || LONEOS || — || align=right | 3.1 km || 
|-id=774 bgcolor=#E9E9E9
| 223774 ||  || — || September 16, 2004 || Siding Spring || SSS || GEF || align=right | 2.0 km || 
|-id=775 bgcolor=#d6d6d6
| 223775 ||  || — || September 16, 2004 || Siding Spring || SSS || — || align=right | 4.4 km || 
|-id=776 bgcolor=#d6d6d6
| 223776 ||  || — || September 17, 2004 || Anderson Mesa || LONEOS || TEL || align=right | 2.2 km || 
|-id=777 bgcolor=#d6d6d6
| 223777 ||  || — || September 17, 2004 || Anderson Mesa || LONEOS || CHA || align=right | 3.8 km || 
|-id=778 bgcolor=#E9E9E9
| 223778 ||  || — || September 16, 2004 || Kitt Peak || Spacewatch || — || align=right | 2.6 km || 
|-id=779 bgcolor=#E9E9E9
| 223779 ||  || — || September 17, 2004 || Kitt Peak || Spacewatch || — || align=right | 3.2 km || 
|-id=780 bgcolor=#E9E9E9
| 223780 ||  || — || September 17, 2004 || Socorro || LINEAR || XIZ || align=right | 1.7 km || 
|-id=781 bgcolor=#d6d6d6
| 223781 ||  || — || September 17, 2004 || Socorro || LINEAR || — || align=right | 3.4 km || 
|-id=782 bgcolor=#E9E9E9
| 223782 ||  || — || September 17, 2004 || Kitt Peak || Spacewatch || HOF || align=right | 3.1 km || 
|-id=783 bgcolor=#E9E9E9
| 223783 ||  || — || September 18, 2004 || Socorro || LINEAR || — || align=right | 2.8 km || 
|-id=784 bgcolor=#d6d6d6
| 223784 ||  || — || September 18, 2004 || Socorro || LINEAR || — || align=right | 3.9 km || 
|-id=785 bgcolor=#E9E9E9
| 223785 ||  || — || September 18, 2004 || Socorro || LINEAR || DOR || align=right | 3.9 km || 
|-id=786 bgcolor=#E9E9E9
| 223786 ||  || — || September 18, 2004 || Socorro || LINEAR || — || align=right | 4.8 km || 
|-id=787 bgcolor=#d6d6d6
| 223787 ||  || — || September 18, 2004 || Socorro || LINEAR || — || align=right | 5.3 km || 
|-id=788 bgcolor=#d6d6d6
| 223788 ||  || — || September 22, 2004 || Socorro || LINEAR || ALA || align=right | 4.9 km || 
|-id=789 bgcolor=#d6d6d6
| 223789 ||  || — || September 22, 2004 || Kitt Peak || Spacewatch || — || align=right | 3.8 km || 
|-id=790 bgcolor=#d6d6d6
| 223790 ||  || — || September 22, 2004 || Kitt Peak || Spacewatch || KOR || align=right | 1.7 km || 
|-id=791 bgcolor=#E9E9E9
| 223791 ||  || — || October 3, 2004 || Palomar || NEAT || — || align=right | 3.6 km || 
|-id=792 bgcolor=#d6d6d6
| 223792 ||  || — || October 5, 2004 || Kitt Peak || Spacewatch || KAR || align=right | 1.4 km || 
|-id=793 bgcolor=#E9E9E9
| 223793 ||  || — || October 5, 2004 || Antares || ARO || WIT || align=right | 1.4 km || 
|-id=794 bgcolor=#d6d6d6
| 223794 ||  || — || October 5, 2004 || Sonoita || W. R. Cooney Jr., J. Gross || — || align=right | 3.0 km || 
|-id=795 bgcolor=#d6d6d6
| 223795 ||  || — || October 8, 2004 || Anderson Mesa || LONEOS || — || align=right | 4.0 km || 
|-id=796 bgcolor=#FA8072
| 223796 ||  || — || October 10, 2004 || Socorro || LINEAR || H || align=right data-sort-value="0.97" | 970 m || 
|-id=797 bgcolor=#d6d6d6
| 223797 ||  || — || October 8, 2004 || Goodricke-Pigott || R. A. Tucker || — || align=right | 4.8 km || 
|-id=798 bgcolor=#d6d6d6
| 223798 ||  || — || October 4, 2004 || Kitt Peak || Spacewatch || EOS || align=right | 2.4 km || 
|-id=799 bgcolor=#d6d6d6
| 223799 ||  || — || October 4, 2004 || Kitt Peak || Spacewatch || KOR || align=right | 1.5 km || 
|-id=800 bgcolor=#d6d6d6
| 223800 ||  || — || October 4, 2004 || Kitt Peak || Spacewatch || — || align=right | 4.0 km || 
|}

223801–223900 

|-bgcolor=#E9E9E9
| 223801 ||  || — || October 4, 2004 || Kitt Peak || Spacewatch || AST || align=right | 3.1 km || 
|-id=802 bgcolor=#d6d6d6
| 223802 ||  || — || October 4, 2004 || Kitt Peak || Spacewatch || EOS || align=right | 2.0 km || 
|-id=803 bgcolor=#E9E9E9
| 223803 ||  || — || October 4, 2004 || Kitt Peak || Spacewatch || DOR || align=right | 3.3 km || 
|-id=804 bgcolor=#d6d6d6
| 223804 ||  || — || October 4, 2004 || Kitt Peak || Spacewatch || — || align=right | 3.2 km || 
|-id=805 bgcolor=#d6d6d6
| 223805 ||  || — || October 4, 2004 || Kitt Peak || Spacewatch || KOR || align=right | 2.1 km || 
|-id=806 bgcolor=#d6d6d6
| 223806 ||  || — || October 4, 2004 || Kitt Peak || Spacewatch || KOR || align=right | 1.7 km || 
|-id=807 bgcolor=#d6d6d6
| 223807 ||  || — || October 4, 2004 || Kitt Peak || Spacewatch || — || align=right | 4.6 km || 
|-id=808 bgcolor=#E9E9E9
| 223808 ||  || — || October 5, 2004 || Anderson Mesa || LONEOS || — || align=right | 3.8 km || 
|-id=809 bgcolor=#d6d6d6
| 223809 ||  || — || October 5, 2004 || Anderson Mesa || LONEOS || ITH || align=right | 2.3 km || 
|-id=810 bgcolor=#d6d6d6
| 223810 ||  || — || October 5, 2004 || Palomar || NEAT || — || align=right | 3.9 km || 
|-id=811 bgcolor=#d6d6d6
| 223811 ||  || — || October 6, 2004 || Kitt Peak || Spacewatch || — || align=right | 3.4 km || 
|-id=812 bgcolor=#d6d6d6
| 223812 ||  || — || October 6, 2004 || Kitt Peak || Spacewatch || — || align=right | 3.8 km || 
|-id=813 bgcolor=#d6d6d6
| 223813 ||  || — || October 5, 2004 || Kitt Peak || Spacewatch || KAR || align=right | 1.5 km || 
|-id=814 bgcolor=#E9E9E9
| 223814 ||  || — || October 5, 2004 || Kitt Peak || Spacewatch || — || align=right | 2.6 km || 
|-id=815 bgcolor=#d6d6d6
| 223815 ||  || — || October 5, 2004 || Kitt Peak || Spacewatch || — || align=right | 3.7 km || 
|-id=816 bgcolor=#d6d6d6
| 223816 ||  || — || October 5, 2004 || Kitt Peak || Spacewatch || EOS || align=right | 2.1 km || 
|-id=817 bgcolor=#d6d6d6
| 223817 ||  || — || October 5, 2004 || Kitt Peak || Spacewatch || — || align=right | 3.2 km || 
|-id=818 bgcolor=#d6d6d6
| 223818 ||  || — || October 6, 2004 || Palomar || NEAT || EOS || align=right | 3.4 km || 
|-id=819 bgcolor=#E9E9E9
| 223819 ||  || — || October 7, 2004 || Socorro || LINEAR || HOF || align=right | 4.3 km || 
|-id=820 bgcolor=#d6d6d6
| 223820 ||  || — || October 7, 2004 || Socorro || LINEAR || — || align=right | 4.3 km || 
|-id=821 bgcolor=#E9E9E9
| 223821 ||  || — || October 7, 2004 || Socorro || LINEAR || — || align=right | 3.3 km || 
|-id=822 bgcolor=#d6d6d6
| 223822 ||  || — || October 7, 2004 || Anderson Mesa || LONEOS || — || align=right | 5.0 km || 
|-id=823 bgcolor=#d6d6d6
| 223823 ||  || — || October 7, 2004 || Kitt Peak || Spacewatch || — || align=right | 3.4 km || 
|-id=824 bgcolor=#d6d6d6
| 223824 ||  || — || October 7, 2004 || Palomar || NEAT || EOS || align=right | 2.8 km || 
|-id=825 bgcolor=#d6d6d6
| 223825 ||  || — || October 15, 2004 || Goodricke-Pigott || Goodricke-Pigott Obs. || — || align=right | 2.4 km || 
|-id=826 bgcolor=#E9E9E9
| 223826 ||  || — || October 7, 2004 || Anderson Mesa || LONEOS || HOF || align=right | 4.1 km || 
|-id=827 bgcolor=#d6d6d6
| 223827 ||  || — || October 7, 2004 || Anderson Mesa || LONEOS || — || align=right | 5.2 km || 
|-id=828 bgcolor=#d6d6d6
| 223828 ||  || — || October 7, 2004 || Anderson Mesa || LONEOS || KOR || align=right | 2.3 km || 
|-id=829 bgcolor=#d6d6d6
| 223829 ||  || — || October 7, 2004 || Socorro || LINEAR || KOR || align=right | 1.7 km || 
|-id=830 bgcolor=#E9E9E9
| 223830 ||  || — || October 7, 2004 || Socorro || LINEAR || WIT || align=right | 2.1 km || 
|-id=831 bgcolor=#d6d6d6
| 223831 ||  || — || October 7, 2004 || Socorro || LINEAR || TEL || align=right | 1.9 km || 
|-id=832 bgcolor=#d6d6d6
| 223832 ||  || — || October 8, 2004 || Anderson Mesa || LONEOS || — || align=right | 4.5 km || 
|-id=833 bgcolor=#d6d6d6
| 223833 ||  || — || October 8, 2004 || Anderson Mesa || LONEOS || — || align=right | 5.0 km || 
|-id=834 bgcolor=#d6d6d6
| 223834 ||  || — || October 4, 2004 || Kitt Peak || Spacewatch || — || align=right | 3.8 km || 
|-id=835 bgcolor=#d6d6d6
| 223835 ||  || — || October 4, 2004 || Kitt Peak || Spacewatch || KOR || align=right | 1.7 km || 
|-id=836 bgcolor=#d6d6d6
| 223836 ||  || — || October 4, 2004 || Kitt Peak || Spacewatch || EOS || align=right | 3.1 km || 
|-id=837 bgcolor=#d6d6d6
| 223837 ||  || — || October 4, 2004 || Kitt Peak || Spacewatch || — || align=right | 4.4 km || 
|-id=838 bgcolor=#d6d6d6
| 223838 ||  || — || October 4, 2004 || Kitt Peak || Spacewatch || — || align=right | 3.9 km || 
|-id=839 bgcolor=#d6d6d6
| 223839 ||  || — || October 6, 2004 || Kitt Peak || Spacewatch || — || align=right | 3.3 km || 
|-id=840 bgcolor=#d6d6d6
| 223840 ||  || — || October 6, 2004 || Kitt Peak || Spacewatch || — || align=right | 2.8 km || 
|-id=841 bgcolor=#d6d6d6
| 223841 ||  || — || October 6, 2004 || Kitt Peak || Spacewatch || — || align=right | 4.0 km || 
|-id=842 bgcolor=#E9E9E9
| 223842 ||  || — || October 7, 2004 || Socorro || LINEAR || — || align=right | 3.6 km || 
|-id=843 bgcolor=#d6d6d6
| 223843 ||  || — || October 8, 2004 || Socorro || LINEAR || — || align=right | 3.0 km || 
|-id=844 bgcolor=#d6d6d6
| 223844 ||  || — || October 8, 2004 || Socorro || LINEAR || EOS || align=right | 3.4 km || 
|-id=845 bgcolor=#E9E9E9
| 223845 ||  || — || October 9, 2004 || Socorro || LINEAR || HEN || align=right | 1.3 km || 
|-id=846 bgcolor=#E9E9E9
| 223846 ||  || — || October 7, 2004 || Kitt Peak || Spacewatch || — || align=right | 2.7 km || 
|-id=847 bgcolor=#d6d6d6
| 223847 ||  || — || October 7, 2004 || Kitt Peak || Spacewatch || — || align=right | 3.9 km || 
|-id=848 bgcolor=#d6d6d6
| 223848 ||  || — || October 7, 2004 || Kitt Peak || Spacewatch || — || align=right | 2.1 km || 
|-id=849 bgcolor=#d6d6d6
| 223849 ||  || — || October 7, 2004 || Kitt Peak || Spacewatch || — || align=right | 3.8 km || 
|-id=850 bgcolor=#d6d6d6
| 223850 ||  || — || October 7, 2004 || Kitt Peak || Spacewatch || HYG || align=right | 3.9 km || 
|-id=851 bgcolor=#d6d6d6
| 223851 ||  || — || October 7, 2004 || Kitt Peak || Spacewatch || — || align=right | 3.5 km || 
|-id=852 bgcolor=#d6d6d6
| 223852 ||  || — || October 8, 2004 || Kitt Peak || Spacewatch || CHA || align=right | 3.1 km || 
|-id=853 bgcolor=#d6d6d6
| 223853 ||  || — || October 5, 2004 || Kitt Peak || Spacewatch || KOR || align=right | 1.5 km || 
|-id=854 bgcolor=#d6d6d6
| 223854 ||  || — || October 9, 2004 || Kitt Peak || Spacewatch || — || align=right | 3.7 km || 
|-id=855 bgcolor=#d6d6d6
| 223855 ||  || — || October 10, 2004 || Palomar || NEAT || — || align=right | 4.7 km || 
|-id=856 bgcolor=#d6d6d6
| 223856 ||  || — || October 10, 2004 || Socorro || LINEAR || — || align=right | 2.9 km || 
|-id=857 bgcolor=#d6d6d6
| 223857 ||  || — || October 15, 2004 || Mount Lemmon || Mount Lemmon Survey || KOR || align=right | 1.8 km || 
|-id=858 bgcolor=#d6d6d6
| 223858 ||  || — || October 9, 2004 || Kitt Peak || Spacewatch || — || align=right | 4.0 km || 
|-id=859 bgcolor=#d6d6d6
| 223859 ||  || — || October 9, 2004 || Kitt Peak || Spacewatch || — || align=right | 2.6 km || 
|-id=860 bgcolor=#d6d6d6
| 223860 ||  || — || October 9, 2004 || Kitt Peak || Spacewatch || — || align=right | 3.6 km || 
|-id=861 bgcolor=#d6d6d6
| 223861 ||  || — || October 8, 2004 || Kitt Peak || Spacewatch || KOR || align=right | 1.7 km || 
|-id=862 bgcolor=#d6d6d6
| 223862 ||  || — || October 8, 2004 || Socorro || LINEAR || VER || align=right | 4.0 km || 
|-id=863 bgcolor=#d6d6d6
| 223863 ||  || — || October 10, 2004 || Kitt Peak || Spacewatch || EOS || align=right | 2.9 km || 
|-id=864 bgcolor=#d6d6d6
| 223864 ||  || — || October 10, 2004 || Kitt Peak || Spacewatch || EOS || align=right | 2.8 km || 
|-id=865 bgcolor=#d6d6d6
| 223865 ||  || — || October 10, 2004 || Socorro || LINEAR || EOS || align=right | 3.2 km || 
|-id=866 bgcolor=#d6d6d6
| 223866 ||  || — || October 10, 2004 || Socorro || LINEAR || — || align=right | 4.2 km || 
|-id=867 bgcolor=#d6d6d6
| 223867 ||  || — || October 11, 2004 || Kitt Peak || Spacewatch || VER || align=right | 4.5 km || 
|-id=868 bgcolor=#E9E9E9
| 223868 ||  || — || October 3, 2004 || Palomar || NEAT || AGN || align=right | 2.1 km || 
|-id=869 bgcolor=#d6d6d6
| 223869 ||  || — || October 10, 2004 || Kitt Peak || Spacewatch || — || align=right | 3.5 km || 
|-id=870 bgcolor=#d6d6d6
| 223870 ||  || — || October 11, 2004 || Kitt Peak || Spacewatch || — || align=right | 3.7 km || 
|-id=871 bgcolor=#d6d6d6
| 223871 ||  || — || October 14, 2004 || Socorro || LINEAR || EOS || align=right | 3.2 km || 
|-id=872 bgcolor=#d6d6d6
| 223872 ||  || — || October 15, 2004 || Kitt Peak || Spacewatch || TEL || align=right | 2.6 km || 
|-id=873 bgcolor=#d6d6d6
| 223873 ||  || — || October 14, 2004 || Palomar || NEAT || — || align=right | 4.4 km || 
|-id=874 bgcolor=#d6d6d6
| 223874 ||  || — || October 7, 2004 || Kitt Peak || Spacewatch || HYG || align=right | 4.2 km || 
|-id=875 bgcolor=#d6d6d6
| 223875 ||  || — || October 9, 2004 || Kitt Peak || Spacewatch || — || align=right | 4.1 km || 
|-id=876 bgcolor=#d6d6d6
| 223876 ||  || — || October 9, 2004 || Kitt Peak || Spacewatch || — || align=right | 2.6 km || 
|-id=877 bgcolor=#d6d6d6
| 223877 Kutler ||  ||  || October 15, 2004 || Mount Lemmon || Mount Lemmon Survey || — || align=right | 4.9 km || 
|-id=878 bgcolor=#d6d6d6
| 223878 ||  || — || October 18, 2004 || Socorro || LINEAR || — || align=right | 3.4 km || 
|-id=879 bgcolor=#d6d6d6
| 223879 ||  || — || October 18, 2004 || Kitt Peak || M. W. Buie || KOR || align=right | 1.7 km || 
|-id=880 bgcolor=#d6d6d6
| 223880 ||  || — || October 21, 2004 || Socorro || LINEAR || — || align=right | 4.0 km || 
|-id=881 bgcolor=#d6d6d6
| 223881 ||  || — || October 23, 2004 || Kitt Peak || Spacewatch || KOR || align=right | 2.3 km || 
|-id=882 bgcolor=#d6d6d6
| 223882 ||  || — || October 21, 2004 || Socorro || LINEAR || — || align=right | 4.3 km || 
|-id=883 bgcolor=#d6d6d6
| 223883 ||  || — || November 2, 2004 || Goodricke-Pigott || R. A. Tucker || — || align=right | 4.8 km || 
|-id=884 bgcolor=#d6d6d6
| 223884 ||  || — || November 3, 2004 || Anderson Mesa || LONEOS || — || align=right | 3.3 km || 
|-id=885 bgcolor=#d6d6d6
| 223885 ||  || — || November 3, 2004 || Kitt Peak || Spacewatch || — || align=right | 4.6 km || 
|-id=886 bgcolor=#d6d6d6
| 223886 ||  || — || November 3, 2004 || Anderson Mesa || LONEOS || — || align=right | 5.5 km || 
|-id=887 bgcolor=#d6d6d6
| 223887 ||  || — || November 3, 2004 || Anderson Mesa || LONEOS || — || align=right | 3.7 km || 
|-id=888 bgcolor=#d6d6d6
| 223888 ||  || — || November 4, 2004 || Kitt Peak || Spacewatch || — || align=right | 3.9 km || 
|-id=889 bgcolor=#E9E9E9
| 223889 ||  || — || November 4, 2004 || Catalina || CSS || WIT || align=right | 1.7 km || 
|-id=890 bgcolor=#fefefe
| 223890 ||  || — || November 4, 2004 || Catalina || CSS || H || align=right | 1.0 km || 
|-id=891 bgcolor=#d6d6d6
| 223891 ||  || — || November 4, 2004 || Catalina || CSS || EMA || align=right | 4.7 km || 
|-id=892 bgcolor=#d6d6d6
| 223892 ||  || — || November 4, 2004 || Catalina || CSS || — || align=right | 3.4 km || 
|-id=893 bgcolor=#d6d6d6
| 223893 ||  || — || November 5, 2004 || Campo Imperatore || CINEOS || URS || align=right | 5.3 km || 
|-id=894 bgcolor=#d6d6d6
| 223894 ||  || — || November 5, 2004 || Palomar || NEAT || — || align=right | 4.5 km || 
|-id=895 bgcolor=#d6d6d6
| 223895 ||  || — || November 4, 2004 || Anderson Mesa || LONEOS || — || align=right | 7.2 km || 
|-id=896 bgcolor=#d6d6d6
| 223896 ||  || — || November 4, 2004 || Catalina || CSS || — || align=right | 3.6 km || 
|-id=897 bgcolor=#d6d6d6
| 223897 ||  || — || November 5, 2004 || Kitt Peak || Spacewatch || — || align=right | 4.7 km || 
|-id=898 bgcolor=#d6d6d6
| 223898 ||  || — || November 5, 2004 || Palomar || NEAT || HYG || align=right | 4.5 km || 
|-id=899 bgcolor=#d6d6d6
| 223899 ||  || — || November 7, 2004 || Socorro || LINEAR || — || align=right | 3.1 km || 
|-id=900 bgcolor=#d6d6d6
| 223900 ||  || — || November 3, 2004 || Kitt Peak || Spacewatch || — || align=right | 3.4 km || 
|}

223901–224000 

|-bgcolor=#d6d6d6
| 223901 ||  || — || November 3, 2004 || Kitt Peak || Spacewatch || — || align=right | 2.7 km || 
|-id=902 bgcolor=#d6d6d6
| 223902 ||  || — || November 4, 2004 || Kitt Peak || Spacewatch || — || align=right | 3.2 km || 
|-id=903 bgcolor=#d6d6d6
| 223903 ||  || — || November 4, 2004 || Kitt Peak || Spacewatch || EOS || align=right | 4.7 km || 
|-id=904 bgcolor=#d6d6d6
| 223904 ||  || — || November 4, 2004 || Kitt Peak || Spacewatch || EOS || align=right | 2.7 km || 
|-id=905 bgcolor=#d6d6d6
| 223905 ||  || — || November 9, 2004 || Catalina || CSS || — || align=right | 4.4 km || 
|-id=906 bgcolor=#d6d6d6
| 223906 ||  || — || November 9, 2004 || Catalina || CSS || — || align=right | 5.7 km || 
|-id=907 bgcolor=#d6d6d6
| 223907 ||  || — || November 10, 2004 || Wrightwood || J. W. Young || VER || align=right | 4.6 km || 
|-id=908 bgcolor=#d6d6d6
| 223908 ||  || — || November 10, 2004 || Wrightwood || J. W. Young || — || align=right | 4.1 km || 
|-id=909 bgcolor=#d6d6d6
| 223909 ||  || — || November 10, 2004 || Goodricke-Pigott || Goodricke-Pigott Obs. || — || align=right | 6.1 km || 
|-id=910 bgcolor=#d6d6d6
| 223910 ||  || — || November 6, 2004 || Palomar || NEAT || EOS || align=right | 3.3 km || 
|-id=911 bgcolor=#d6d6d6
| 223911 ||  || — || November 14, 2004 || Cordell-Lorenz || D. T. Durig || — || align=right | 4.2 km || 
|-id=912 bgcolor=#d6d6d6
| 223912 ||  || — || November 9, 2004 || Kitt Peak || M. W. Buie || — || align=right | 3.2 km || 
|-id=913 bgcolor=#d6d6d6
| 223913 ||  || — || November 5, 2004 || Anderson Mesa || LONEOS || — || align=right | 5.2 km || 
|-id=914 bgcolor=#d6d6d6
| 223914 ||  || — || November 7, 2004 || Socorro || LINEAR || — || align=right | 5.4 km || 
|-id=915 bgcolor=#d6d6d6
| 223915 ||  || — || November 3, 2004 || Kitt Peak || Spacewatch || — || align=right | 4.0 km || 
|-id=916 bgcolor=#d6d6d6
| 223916 ||  || — || November 3, 2004 || Kitt Peak || Spacewatch || KOR || align=right | 1.8 km || 
|-id=917 bgcolor=#d6d6d6
| 223917 ||  || — || November 3, 2004 || Catalina || CSS || URS || align=right | 5.1 km || 
|-id=918 bgcolor=#d6d6d6
| 223918 ||  || — || November 3, 2004 || Palomar || NEAT || — || align=right | 4.3 km || 
|-id=919 bgcolor=#d6d6d6
| 223919 ||  || — || November 10, 2004 || Kitt Peak || Spacewatch || — || align=right | 4.3 km || 
|-id=920 bgcolor=#d6d6d6
| 223920 ||  || — || November 9, 2004 || Mauna Kea || C. Veillet || KAR || align=right | 1.5 km || 
|-id=921 bgcolor=#d6d6d6
| 223921 || 2004 WJ || — || November 17, 2004 || Siding Spring || SSS || — || align=right | 3.0 km || 
|-id=922 bgcolor=#d6d6d6
| 223922 ||  || — || November 17, 2004 || Siding Spring || SSS || EOS || align=right | 3.4 km || 
|-id=923 bgcolor=#d6d6d6
| 223923 ||  || — || November 17, 2004 || Campo Imperatore || CINEOS || — || align=right | 4.9 km || 
|-id=924 bgcolor=#d6d6d6
| 223924 ||  || — || November 18, 2004 || Campo Imperatore || CINEOS || — || align=right | 4.4 km || 
|-id=925 bgcolor=#d6d6d6
| 223925 ||  || — || November 18, 2004 || Campo Imperatore || CINEOS || — || align=right | 5.4 km || 
|-id=926 bgcolor=#d6d6d6
| 223926 ||  || — || November 19, 2004 || Socorro || LINEAR || — || align=right | 5.5 km || 
|-id=927 bgcolor=#d6d6d6
| 223927 ||  || — || November 19, 2004 || Catalina || CSS || — || align=right | 3.2 km || 
|-id=928 bgcolor=#E9E9E9
| 223928 ||  || — || November 19, 2004 || Socorro || LINEAR || — || align=right | 4.2 km || 
|-id=929 bgcolor=#d6d6d6
| 223929 ||  || — || November 19, 2004 || Socorro || LINEAR || — || align=right | 4.6 km || 
|-id=930 bgcolor=#d6d6d6
| 223930 ||  || — || December 1, 2004 || Catalina || CSS || EOS || align=right | 2.9 km || 
|-id=931 bgcolor=#d6d6d6
| 223931 ||  || — || December 1, 2004 || Palomar || NEAT || — || align=right | 4.7 km || 
|-id=932 bgcolor=#d6d6d6
| 223932 ||  || — || December 2, 2004 || Catalina || CSS || — || align=right | 3.1 km || 
|-id=933 bgcolor=#d6d6d6
| 223933 ||  || — || December 2, 2004 || Palomar || NEAT || ALA || align=right | 6.0 km || 
|-id=934 bgcolor=#d6d6d6
| 223934 ||  || — || December 2, 2004 || Palomar || NEAT || HYG || align=right | 3.4 km || 
|-id=935 bgcolor=#d6d6d6
| 223935 ||  || — || December 2, 2004 || Socorro || LINEAR || — || align=right | 3.4 km || 
|-id=936 bgcolor=#d6d6d6
| 223936 ||  || — || December 2, 2004 || Palomar || NEAT || EOS || align=right | 3.7 km || 
|-id=937 bgcolor=#d6d6d6
| 223937 ||  || — || December 2, 2004 || Palomar || NEAT || — || align=right | 3.5 km || 
|-id=938 bgcolor=#d6d6d6
| 223938 ||  || — || December 9, 2004 || Socorro || LINEAR || — || align=right | 12 km || 
|-id=939 bgcolor=#d6d6d6
| 223939 ||  || — || December 8, 2004 || Socorro || LINEAR || — || align=right | 3.7 km || 
|-id=940 bgcolor=#d6d6d6
| 223940 ||  || — || December 8, 2004 || Socorro || LINEAR || — || align=right | 4.8 km || 
|-id=941 bgcolor=#d6d6d6
| 223941 ||  || — || December 9, 2004 || Catalina || CSS || — || align=right | 4.1 km || 
|-id=942 bgcolor=#d6d6d6
| 223942 ||  || — || December 9, 2004 || Kitt Peak || Spacewatch || HYG || align=right | 4.8 km || 
|-id=943 bgcolor=#d6d6d6
| 223943 ||  || — || December 10, 2004 || Socorro || LINEAR || HYG || align=right | 6.0 km || 
|-id=944 bgcolor=#d6d6d6
| 223944 ||  || — || December 10, 2004 || Kitt Peak || Spacewatch || — || align=right | 5.7 km || 
|-id=945 bgcolor=#d6d6d6
| 223945 ||  || — || December 9, 2004 || Catalina || CSS || HYG || align=right | 4.8 km || 
|-id=946 bgcolor=#d6d6d6
| 223946 ||  || — || December 11, 2004 || Campo Imperatore || CINEOS || — || align=right | 2.8 km || 
|-id=947 bgcolor=#d6d6d6
| 223947 ||  || — || December 11, 2004 || Campo Imperatore || CINEOS || EOS || align=right | 2.9 km || 
|-id=948 bgcolor=#d6d6d6
| 223948 ||  || — || December 11, 2004 || Campo Imperatore || CINEOS || — || align=right | 3.6 km || 
|-id=949 bgcolor=#d6d6d6
| 223949 ||  || — || December 11, 2004 || Socorro || LINEAR || — || align=right | 3.9 km || 
|-id=950 bgcolor=#d6d6d6
| 223950 Mississauga ||  ||  || December 9, 2004 || Jarnac || Jarnac Obs. || — || align=right | 4.8 km || 
|-id=951 bgcolor=#d6d6d6
| 223951 ||  || — || December 7, 2004 || Socorro || LINEAR || — || align=right | 4.1 km || 
|-id=952 bgcolor=#d6d6d6
| 223952 ||  || — || December 11, 2004 || Socorro || LINEAR || — || align=right | 5.8 km || 
|-id=953 bgcolor=#d6d6d6
| 223953 ||  || — || December 12, 2004 || Campo Imperatore || CINEOS || — || align=right | 5.0 km || 
|-id=954 bgcolor=#d6d6d6
| 223954 ||  || — || December 12, 2004 || Kitt Peak || Spacewatch || — || align=right | 3.0 km || 
|-id=955 bgcolor=#d6d6d6
| 223955 ||  || — || December 10, 2004 || Socorro || LINEAR || — || align=right | 4.5 km || 
|-id=956 bgcolor=#d6d6d6
| 223956 ||  || — || December 8, 2004 || Socorro || LINEAR || — || align=right | 5.7 km || 
|-id=957 bgcolor=#d6d6d6
| 223957 ||  || — || December 8, 2004 || Socorro || LINEAR || Tj (2.89) || align=right | 9.0 km || 
|-id=958 bgcolor=#d6d6d6
| 223958 ||  || — || December 10, 2004 || Socorro || LINEAR || — || align=right | 5.9 km || 
|-id=959 bgcolor=#d6d6d6
| 223959 ||  || — || December 10, 2004 || Socorro || LINEAR || — || align=right | 7.2 km || 
|-id=960 bgcolor=#E9E9E9
| 223960 ||  || — || December 10, 2004 || Socorro || LINEAR || — || align=right | 4.9 km || 
|-id=961 bgcolor=#d6d6d6
| 223961 ||  || — || December 11, 2004 || Kitt Peak || Spacewatch || — || align=right | 4.3 km || 
|-id=962 bgcolor=#d6d6d6
| 223962 ||  || — || December 11, 2004 || Kitt Peak || Spacewatch || — || align=right | 3.7 km || 
|-id=963 bgcolor=#d6d6d6
| 223963 ||  || — || December 9, 2004 || Catalina || CSS || — || align=right | 3.4 km || 
|-id=964 bgcolor=#d6d6d6
| 223964 ||  || — || December 11, 2004 || Kitt Peak || Spacewatch || — || align=right | 5.0 km || 
|-id=965 bgcolor=#d6d6d6
| 223965 ||  || — || December 14, 2004 || Anderson Mesa || LONEOS || — || align=right | 7.0 km || 
|-id=966 bgcolor=#d6d6d6
| 223966 ||  || — || December 11, 2004 || Socorro || LINEAR || — || align=right | 3.3 km || 
|-id=967 bgcolor=#d6d6d6
| 223967 ||  || — || December 14, 2004 || Socorro || LINEAR || — || align=right | 3.3 km || 
|-id=968 bgcolor=#d6d6d6
| 223968 ||  || — || December 9, 2004 || Kitt Peak || Spacewatch || — || align=right | 4.1 km || 
|-id=969 bgcolor=#d6d6d6
| 223969 ||  || — || December 11, 2004 || Catalina || CSS || MEL || align=right | 4.4 km || 
|-id=970 bgcolor=#d6d6d6
| 223970 ||  || — || December 14, 2004 || Socorro || LINEAR || — || align=right | 3.1 km || 
|-id=971 bgcolor=#d6d6d6
| 223971 ||  || — || December 14, 2004 || Anderson Mesa || LONEOS || — || align=right | 5.6 km || 
|-id=972 bgcolor=#d6d6d6
| 223972 ||  || — || December 2, 2004 || Kitt Peak || Spacewatch || — || align=right | 5.0 km || 
|-id=973 bgcolor=#d6d6d6
| 223973 ||  || — || December 2, 2004 || Palomar || NEAT || VER || align=right | 4.9 km || 
|-id=974 bgcolor=#d6d6d6
| 223974 ||  || — || December 10, 2004 || Kitt Peak || Spacewatch || HYG || align=right | 3.1 km || 
|-id=975 bgcolor=#d6d6d6
| 223975 ||  || — || December 14, 2004 || Kitt Peak || Spacewatch || THM || align=right | 3.0 km || 
|-id=976 bgcolor=#d6d6d6
| 223976 ||  || — || December 15, 2004 || Catalina || CSS || — || align=right | 3.9 km || 
|-id=977 bgcolor=#FA8072
| 223977 ||  || — || December 16, 2004 || Anderson Mesa || LONEOS || H || align=right data-sort-value="0.97" | 970 m || 
|-id=978 bgcolor=#d6d6d6
| 223978 ||  || — || December 18, 2004 || Mount Lemmon || Mount Lemmon Survey || — || align=right | 3.4 km || 
|-id=979 bgcolor=#d6d6d6
| 223979 ||  || — || December 18, 2004 || Mount Lemmon || Mount Lemmon Survey || THM || align=right | 3.0 km || 
|-id=980 bgcolor=#d6d6d6
| 223980 ||  || — || December 18, 2004 || Socorro || LINEAR || — || align=right | 3.4 km || 
|-id=981 bgcolor=#fefefe
| 223981 ||  || — || December 22, 2004 || Catalina || CSS || H || align=right | 1.1 km || 
|-id=982 bgcolor=#d6d6d6
| 223982 ||  || — || January 1, 2005 || Catalina || CSS || — || align=right | 5.9 km || 
|-id=983 bgcolor=#d6d6d6
| 223983 ||  || — || January 6, 2005 || Socorro || LINEAR || — || align=right | 4.3 km || 
|-id=984 bgcolor=#d6d6d6
| 223984 ||  || — || January 6, 2005 || Socorro || LINEAR || MEL || align=right | 7.2 km || 
|-id=985 bgcolor=#d6d6d6
| 223985 ||  || — || January 13, 2005 || Socorro || LINEAR || — || align=right | 5.8 km || 
|-id=986 bgcolor=#d6d6d6
| 223986 ||  || — || January 15, 2005 || Catalina || CSS || — || align=right | 2.5 km || 
|-id=987 bgcolor=#fefefe
| 223987 ||  || — || January 16, 2005 || Socorro || LINEAR || H || align=right | 1.1 km || 
|-id=988 bgcolor=#d6d6d6
| 223988 ||  || — || January 16, 2005 || Junk Bond || Junk Bond Obs. || — || align=right | 4.3 km || 
|-id=989 bgcolor=#d6d6d6
| 223989 ||  || — || January 31, 2005 || Socorro || LINEAR || — || align=right | 4.7 km || 
|-id=990 bgcolor=#d6d6d6
| 223990 ||  || — || February 3, 2005 || Socorro || LINEAR || — || align=right | 5.6 km || 
|-id=991 bgcolor=#d6d6d6
| 223991 ||  || — || February 2, 2005 || Catalina || CSS || HYG || align=right | 6.0 km || 
|-id=992 bgcolor=#d6d6d6
| 223992 ||  || — || March 2, 2005 || Catalina || CSS || SHU3:2 || align=right | 8.3 km || 
|-id=993 bgcolor=#fefefe
| 223993 ||  || — || March 8, 2005 || Socorro || LINEAR || H || align=right data-sort-value="0.75" | 750 m || 
|-id=994 bgcolor=#fefefe
| 223994 ||  || — || March 8, 2005 || Kitt Peak || Spacewatch || — || align=right data-sort-value="0.81" | 810 m || 
|-id=995 bgcolor=#d6d6d6
| 223995 ||  || — || March 10, 2005 || Anderson Mesa || LONEOS || — || align=right | 4.1 km || 
|-id=996 bgcolor=#fefefe
| 223996 ||  || — || March 8, 2005 || Catalina || CSS || H || align=right | 1.1 km || 
|-id=997 bgcolor=#fefefe
| 223997 ||  || — || March 13, 2005 || Catalina || CSS || — || align=right data-sort-value="0.96" | 960 m || 
|-id=998 bgcolor=#fefefe
| 223998 ||  || — || March 11, 2005 || Mount Lemmon || Mount Lemmon Survey || — || align=right data-sort-value="0.86" | 860 m || 
|-id=999 bgcolor=#fefefe
| 223999 ||  || — || March 31, 2005 || Goodricke-Pigott || V. Reddy || — || align=right data-sort-value="0.99" | 990 m || 
|-id=000 bgcolor=#FA8072
| 224000 ||  || — || April 1, 2005 || Anderson Mesa || LONEOS || — || align=right | 1.6 km || 
|}

References

External links 
 Discovery Circumstances: Numbered Minor Planets (220001)–(225000) (IAU Minor Planet Center)

0223